Ion Antonescu (– 1 June 1946) was a Romanian military officer and marshal who presided over two successive wartime dictatorships as Prime Minister and Conducător during most of World War II. He was shot by firing squad for war crimes in 1946.

A Romanian Army career officer who made his name during the 1907 peasants' revolt and the World War I Romanian Campaign, the antisemitic Antonescu sympathized with the far-right and fascist National Christian and Iron Guard groups for much of the interwar period. He was a military attaché to France and later Chief of the General Staff, briefly serving as Defense Minister in the National Christian cabinet of Octavian Goga as well as the subsequent First Cristea cabinet, in which he also served as Air and Marine Minister. During the late 1930s, his political stance brought him into conflict with King Carol II and led to his detainment. Antonescu nevertheless rose to political prominence during the political crisis of 1940, and established the National Legionary State, an uneasy partnership with the Iron Guard's leader Horia Sima. After entering Romania into an alliance with Nazi Germany and ensuring Adolf Hitler's confidence, he eliminated the Guard during the Legionary Rebellion of 1941. In addition to being Prime Minister, he served as his own Foreign Minister and Defense Minister. Soon after Romania joined the Axis in Operation Barbarossa, recovering Bessarabia and Northern Bukovina, Antonescu also became Marshal of Romania.

An atypical figure among Holocaust perpetrators, Antonescu enforced policies independently responsible for the deaths of as many as 400,000 people, most of them Bessarabian, Ukrainian and Romanian Jews, as well as Romanian Romani. The regime's complicity in the Holocaust combined pogroms and mass murders such as the Odessa massacre with ethnic cleansing, and systematic deportations to occupied Transnistria. The system in place was nevertheless characterized by singular inconsistencies, prioritizing plunder over killing, showing leniency toward most Jews in the Old Kingdom, and ultimately refusing to adopt the Final Solution as applied throughout Nazi-occupied Europe. This was made possible by the fact that Romania, as a junior ally of Nazi Germany, was able to avoid being occupied by the Wehrmacht and preserve a degree of political autonomy.

Aerial attacks on Romania by the Allies occurred in 1944 and Romanian troops suffered heavy casualties on the Eastern Front, prompting Antonescu to open peace negotiations with the Allies, ending with inconclusive results. On 23 August 1944, the king Michael I led a coup d'état against Antonescu, who was arrested; after the war he was convicted of war crimes, and executed in June 1946. His involvement in the Holocaust was officially reasserted and condemned following the 2003 Wiesel Commission report.

Biography

Early life and career
Born in the town of Pitești, north-west of the capital Bucharest, Antonescu was the scion of an upper-middle class Romanian Orthodox family with some military tradition. He was especially close to his mother, Lița Baranga, who survived his death. His father, an army officer, wanted Ion to follow in his footsteps and thus sent him to attend the Infantry and Cavalry School in Craiova. During his childhood, his father divorced his mother to marry a woman who was a Jewish convert to Orthodoxy. The breakup of his parents' marriage was a traumatic event for the young Antonescu, and he made no secret of his dislike of his stepmother, whom he always depicted as a femme fatale who destroyed what he saw as his parents' happy marriage.

According to one account, Ion Antonescu was briefly a classmate of Wilhelm Filderman, the future Romanian Jewish community activist whose interventions with Conducător Antonescu helped save a number of his coreligionists. After graduation, in 1904, Antonescu joined the Romanian Army with the rank of Second Lieutenant. He spent the following two years attending courses at the Special Cavalry Section in Târgoviște. Reportedly, Antonescu was a zealous and goal-setting student, upset by the slow pace of promotions, and compensated for his diminutive stature through toughness. In time, the reputation of being a tough and ruthless commander, together with his reddish hair, earned him the nickname Câinele Roșu ("The Red Dog"). Antonescu also developed a reputation for questioning his commanders and for appealing over their heads whenever he felt they were wrong.

During the repression of the 1907 peasants' revolt, he headed a cavalry unit in Covurlui County. Opinions on his role in the events diverge: while some historians believe Antonescu was a particularly violent participant in quelling the revolt, others equate his participation with that of regular officers or view it as outstandingly tactful. In addition to restricting peasant protests, Antonescu's unit subdued socialist activities in Galați port. His handling of the situation earned him praise from King Carol I, who sent Crown Prince (future monarch) Ferdinand to congratulate him in front of the whole garrison. The following year, Antonescu was promoted to Lieutenant, and, between 1911 and 1913, he attended the Advanced War School, receiving the rank of Captain upon graduation. In 1913, during the Second Balkan War against Bulgaria, Antonescu served as a staff officer in the First Cavalry Division in Dobruja.

World War I

After 1916, when Romania entered World War I on the Allied side, Ion Antonescu acted as chief of staff for General Constantin Prezan. When enemy troops crossed the mountains from Transylvania into Wallachia, Antonescu was ordered to design a defense plan for Bucharest.

The Romanian royal court, army, and administration were subsequently forced to retreat into Moldavia. Antonescu took part in an important decision involving defensive efforts, an unusual promotion which probably stoked his ambitions. In December, as Prezan became the Chief of the General Staff, Antonescu, who was by now a major, was named the head of operations, being involved in the defence of Moldavia. He contributed to the tactics used during the Battle of Mărășești (July–August 1917), when Romanians under General Eremia Grigorescu managed to stop the advance of German forces under the command of Field Marshal August von Mackensen. Being described as "a talented if prickly individual", Antonescu lived in Prezan's proximity for the remainder of the war and influenced his decisions. Such was the influence of Antonescu on General Prezan that General Alexandru Averescu used the formula "Prezan (Antonescu)" in his memoirs to denote Prezan's plans and actions.

That autumn, Romania's main ally, the Russian Provisional Government, left the conflict. Its successor, Bolshevik Russia, made peace with the Central Powers, leaving Romania the only enemy of the Central Powers on the Eastern Front. In these conditions, the Romanian government made its own peace treaty with the Central Powers. Romania broke the treaty later in the year, on the grounds that King Ferdinand I had not signed it. During the interval, Antonescu, who viewed the separate peace as "the most rational solution," was assigned command over a cavalry regiment. The renewed offensive played a part in ensuring the union of Transylvania with Romania. After the war, Antonescu's merits as an operations officer were noticed by, among others, politician Ion G. Duca, who wrote that "his [Antonescu's] intelligence, skill and activity, brought credit on himself and invaluable service to the country." Another event occurring late in the war is also credited with having played a major part in Antonescu's life: in 1918, Crown Prince Carol (the future King Carol II) left his army posting to a commoner. This outraged Antonescu, who developed enduring contempt for the future king.

Diplomatic assignments and General Staff positions

Lieutenant Colonel Ion Antonescu retained his visibility in the public eye during the interwar period. He participated in the political campaign to earn recognition at the Paris Peace Conference of 1919 for Romania's gains in Transylvania. His nationalist argument about a future state was published as the essay Românii. Origina, trecutul, sacrificiile și drepturile lor ("The Romanians. Their Origin, Their Past, Their Sacrifices and Their Rights"). The booklet advocated extension of Romanian rule beyond the confines of Greater Romania, and recommended, at the risk of war with the emerging Kingdom of Yugoslavia, the annexation of all Banat areas and the Timok Valley.  Antonescu was known for his frequent and erratic changes of mood, going from being extremely angry to being calm to angry again to being calm again within minutes, behaviour that often disoriented those who had to work with him. The Israeli historian Jean Ancel wrote that Antonescu's frequent changes of mood were due to the syphilis he contracted as a young man, a condition he suffered from for the rest of his life.

He became attache in Paris in 1922. He negotiated a credit worth 100 million French francs to purchase French weaponry. He worked together with Romanian diplomat Nicolae Titulescu; the two became personal friends. He was also in contact with the Romanian-born conservative aristocrat and writer Marthe Bibesco, who introduced Antonescu to the ideas of Gustave Le Bon, a researcher of crowd psychology who had an influence on Fascism. Bibesco saw Antonescu as a new version of 19th century nationalist Frenchman Georges Boulanger, introducing him as such to Le Bon. In 1923, he made the acquaintance of lawyer Mihai Antonescu, who was to become his close friend, legal representative and political associate.

After returning to Romania in 1926, Antonescu resumed his teaching in Sibiu, and, in the autumn of 1928, became Secretary-General of the Defense Ministry in the Vintilă Brătianu cabinet. He married Maria Niculescu, for long a resident of France, who had been married twice before: first to a Romanian Police officer, with whom she had a son, Gheorghe (died 1944), and then to a Frenchman of Jewish origin. After a period as Deputy Chief of the General Staff, he was appointed its Chief (1933–1934). These assignments coincided with the rule of Carol's underage son Michael I and his regents, and with Carol's seizure of power in 1930. During this period Antonescu first grew interested in the Iron Guard, an antisemitic and fascist-related movement headed by Corneliu Zelea Codreanu. In his capacity as Deputy Chief of Staff, he ordered the Army's intelligence unit to compile a report on the faction, and made a series of critical notes on Codreanu's various statements.

As Chief of Staff, Antonescu reportedly had his first confrontation with the political class and the monarch. His projects for weapon modernization were questioned by Defense Minister Paul Angelescu, leading Antonescu to present his resignation. According to another account, he completed an official report on the embezzlement of Army funds which indirectly implicated Carol and his camarilla (see Škoda Affair). The king consequently ordered him out of office, provoking indignation among sections of the political mainstream. On Carol's orders, Antonescu was placed under surveillance by the Siguranța Statului intelligence service, and closely monitored by the Interior Ministry Undersecretary Armand Călinescu. The officer's political credentials were on the rise, as he was able to establish and maintain contacts with people on all sides of the political spectrum, while support for Carol plummeted. Among these were contacts with the two main democratic groups, the National Liberal and the National Peasants', parties known respectively as PNL and PNȚ. He was also engaged in discussions with the rising far right, antisemitic and fascist movements; although in competition with each other, both the National Christian Party (PNC) of Octavian Goga and the Iron Guard sought to attract Antonescu to their side. In 1936, to the authorities' alarm, Army General and Iron Guard member Gheorghe Cantacuzino-Grănicerul arranged a meeting between Ion Antonescu and the movement's leader, Corneliu Codreanu.  Antonescu is reported to have found Codreanu arrogant, but to have welcomed his revolutionizing approach to politics.

Defense portfolio and the Codreanu trials
In late 1937, after the December general election came to an inconclusive result, Carol appointed Goga Prime Minister over a far right cabinet that was the first executive to impose racial discrimination in its treatment of the Jewish community. Goga's appointment was meant to curb the rise of the more popular and even more radical Codreanu. Initially given the Communications portfolio by his rival, Interior Minister Armand Călinescu, Antonescu repeatedly demanded the office of Defense Minister, which he was eventually granted. His mandate coincided with a troubled period, and saw Romania having to choose between its traditional alliance with France, Britain, the crumbling Little Entente and the League of Nations or moving closer to Nazi Germany and its Anti-Comintern Pact. Antonescu's own contribution is disputed by historians, who variously see him as either a supporter of the Anglo-French alliance or, like the PNC itself, more favourable to cooperation with Adolf Hitler's Germany. At the time, Antonescu viewed Romania's alliance with the Entente as insurance against Hungarian and Soviet revanchism, but, as an anti-communist, he was suspicious of the Franco-Soviet rapprochement. Particularly concerned about Hungarian demands in Transylvania, he ordered the General Staff to prepare for a western attack. However, his major contribution in office was in relation to an internal crisis: as a response to violent clashes between the Iron Guard and the PNC's own fascist militia, the Lăncieri, Antonescu extended the already imposed martial law.

The Goga cabinet ended when the tentative rapprochement between Goga and Codreanu prompted Carol to overthrow the democratic system and proclaim his own authoritarian regime (see 1938 Constitution of Romania, National Renaissance Front). The deposed Premier died in 1938, while Antonescu remained a close friend of his widow, Veturia Goga. By that time, revising his earlier stance, Antonescu had also built a close relationship with Codreanu, and was even said to have become his confidant. On Carol's request, he had earlier asked the Guard's leader to consider an alliance with the king, which Codreanu promptly refused in favour of negotiations with Goga, coupled with claims that he was not interested in political battles, an attitude supposedly induced by Antonescu himself.

Soon afterward, Călinescu, acting on indications from the monarch, arrested Codreanu and prosecuted him in two successive trials. Antonescu, whose mandate of Defense Minister had been prolonged under the premiership of Miron Cristea, resigned in protest of Codreanu's arrest. Antonescu's mandate ended on 30 March 1938. He also served as Air and Marine Minister between 2 February and his resignation on 30 March. He was a celebrity defense witness at the latter's first and second trials. During the latter, which resulted in Codreanu's conviction for treason, Antonescu vouched for his friend's honesty while shaking his hand in front of the jury. Upon the conclusion of the trial, the king ordered his former minister interned at Predeal, before assigning him to command the Third Army in the remote eastern region of Bessarabia (and later removing him after Antonescu expressed sympathy for Guardists imprisoned in Chișinău). Attempting to discredit his rival, Carol also ordered Antonescu's wife to be tried for bigamy, based on a false claim that her divorce had not been finalized. Defended by Mihai Antonescu, the officer was able to prove his detractors wrong. Codreanu himself was taken into custody and discreetly killed by the Gendarmes acting on Carol's orders (November 1938).

Carol's regime slowly dissolved into crisis, a dissolution accelerated after the start of World War II, when the military success of the core Axis Powers and the non-aggression pact signed by Germany and the Soviet Union saw Romania isolated and threatened (see Romania during World War II). In 1940, two of Romania's regions, Bessarabia and Northern Bukovina, were lost to a Soviet occupation consented to by the king. This came as Romania, exposed by the Fall of France, was seeking to align its policies with those of Germany. Ion Antonescu himself had come to value a pro-Axis alternative after the 1938 Munich Agreement, when Germany imposed demands on Czechoslovakia with the acquiescence of France and the United Kingdom, leaving locals to fear that, unless reoriented, Romania would follow. Angered by the territorial losses of 1940, General Antonescu sent Carol a general note of protest, and, as a result, was arrested and interned at Bistrița Monastery. While there, he commissioned Mihai Antonescu to establish contacts with Nazi German officials, promising to advance German economic interest, particularly in respect to the local oil industry, in exchange for endorsement. Commenting on Ion Antonescu's ambivalent stance, Hitler's minister to Romania, Wilhelm Fabricius, wrote to his superiors: "I am not convinced that he is a safe man."

Rise to power

Romania's elite had been intensely Francophile ever since Romania had won its independence in the 19th century, indeed so Francophile that the defeat of France in June 1940 had the effect of discrediting the entire elite. Antonescu's internment ended in August, during which interval, under Axis pressure, Romania had ceded Southern Dobruja to Bulgaria (see Treaty of Craiova) and Northern Transylvania to Hungary (see Second Vienna Award). The latter grant caused consternation among large sections of Romania's population, causing Carol's popularity to fall to a record low and provoking large-scale protests in Bucharest, the capital. These movements were organized competitively by the pro-Allied PNȚ, headed by Iuliu Maniu, and the pro-Nazi Iron Guard. The latter group had been revived under the leadership of Horia Sima, and was organizing a coup d'état. In this troubled context, Antonescu simply left his assigned residence. He may have been secretly helped in this by German intercession, but was more directly aided to escape by socialite Alice Sturdza, who was acting on Maniu's request. Antonescu subsequently met with Maniu in Ploiești, where they discussed how best to manage the political situation. While these negotiations were carried out, the monarch himself was being advised by his entourage to recover legitimacy by governing in tandem with the increasingly popular Antonescu, while creating a new political majority from the existing forces. On 2 September 1940, Valer Pop, a courtier and an important member of the camarilla, first advised Carol to appoint Antonescu as Prime Minister as the solution to the crisis. Pop's reasons for advising Carol to appoint Antonescu as Prime Minister were partly because Antonescu, who was known to be friendly with the Iron Guard and who had been imprisoned under Carol, was believed to have enough of an oppositional background to Carol's regime to appease the public and partly because Pop knew that Antonescu, for all his Legionary sympathies, was a member of the elite and believed he would never turn against it. When Carol proved reluctant to make Antonescu Prime Minister, Pop visited the German legation to meet with Fabricius on the night of 4 September 1940 to ask that the German minister phone Carol to tell him that the Reich wanted Antonescu as Prime Minister, and Fabricius's promptly did just that. Carol and Antonescu accepted the proposal, Antonescu being ordered to approach political party leaders Maniu of the PNȚ and Dinu Brătianu of the PNL. They all called for Carol's abdication as a preliminary measure, while Sima, another leader sought after for negotiations, could not be found in time to express his opinion. Antonescu partly complied with the request but also asked Carol to bestow upon him the reserve powers for Romanian heads of state. Carol yielded and, on 5 September 1940, the general became Prime Minister, and Carol transferred most of his dictatorial powers to him. The latter's first measure was to curtail potential resistance within the Army by relieving Bucharest Garrison chief Gheorghe Argeșanu of his position and replacing him with Dumitru Coroamă. Shortly afterward, Antonescu heard rumours that two of Carol's loyalist generals, Gheorghe Mihail and Paul Teodorescu, were planning to have him killed. In reaction, he forced Carol to abdicate, while General Coroamă was refusing to carry out the royal order of shooting down Iron Guardist protesters.

Michael ascended the throne for the second time, while Antonescu's dictatorial powers were confirmed and extended. On 6 September, the day Michael formally assumed the throne, he issued a royal decree declaring Antonescu Conducător (leader) of the state. The same decree relegated the monarch to a ceremonial role. Among Antonescu's subsequent measures was ensuring the safe departure into self-exile of Carol and his mistress Elena Lupescu, granting protection to the royal train when it was attacked by armed members of the Iron Guard. The regime of King Carol had been notorious for being the most corrupt regime in Europe during the 1930s, and when Carol fled Romania, he took with him the better part of the Romanian treasury, leaving the new government with enormous financial problems. Antonescu had expected, perhaps naïvely, that Carol would take with him enough money to provide for a comfortable exile, and was surprised that Carol had cleared out almost the entire national treasury. For the next four years, a major concern of Antonescu's government was attempting to have the Swiss banks where Carol had deposited the assets return the money to Romania; this effort did not meet with success. Horia Sima's subsequent cooperation with Antonescu was endorsed by high-ranking Nazi German officials, many of whom feared the Iron Guard was too weak to rule on its own. Antonescu therefore received the approval of Ambassador Fabricius. Despite early promises, Antonescu abandoned projects for the creation of a national government, and opted instead for a coalition between a military dictatorship lobby and the Iron Guard. He later justified his choice by stating that the Iron Guard "represented the political base of the country at the time." Right from the outset, Antonescu clashed with Sima over economic questions, with Antonescu's main concern being to get the economy growing so as to provide taxes for a treasury looted by Carol, while Sima favored populist economic measures that Antonescu insisted there was no money for.

Antonescu-Sima partnership

The resulting regime, deemed the National Legionary State, was officially proclaimed on 14 September. On that date, the Iron Guard was remodelled into the only legally permitted party in Romania. Antonescu continued as Premier and Conducător, and was named as the Guard's honorary commander. Sima became Deputy Premier and leader of the Guard. Antonescu subsequently ordered the Guardists imprisoned by Carol to be set free. On 6 October, he presided over the Iron Guard's mass rally in Bucharest, one in a series of major celebratory and commemorative events organized by the movement during the late months of 1940. However, he tolerated the PNȚ and PNL's informal existence, allowing them to preserve much of their political support.

There followed a short-lived and always uneasy partnership between Antonescu and Sima. In late September, the new regime denounced all pacts, accords and diplomatic agreements signed under Carol, bringing the country into Germany's orbit while subverting its relationship with a former Balkan ally, the Kingdom of Yugoslavia. Germans troops entered the country in stages, in order to defend the local oil industry and help instruct their Romanian counterparts on Blitzkrieg tactics. On 23 November, Antonescu was in Berlin, where his signature sealed Romania's commitment to the main Axis instrument, the Tripartite Pact. Two days later, the country also adhered to the Nazi-led Anti-Comintern Pact. Other than these generic commitments, Romania had no treaty binding it to Germany, and the Romanian-German alliance functioned informally. Speaking in 1946, Antonescu claimed to have followed the pro-German path in continuation of earlier policies, and for fear of a Nazi protectorate in Romania.

During the National Legionary State period, earlier antisemitic legislation was upheld and strengthened, while the "Romanianization" of Jewish-owned enterprises became standard official practice. Immediately after coming into office, Antonescu himself expanded the anti-Jewish and Nuremberg law-inspired legislation passed by his predecessors Goga and Ion Gigurtu, while tens of new anti-Jewish regulations were passed in 1941–1942. This was done despite his formal pledge to Wilhelm Filderman and the Jewish Communities Federation that, unless engaged in "sabotage," "the Jewish population will not suffer." Antonescu did not reject the application of Legionary policies, but was offended by Sima's advocacy of paramilitarism and the Guard's frequent recourse to street violence. He drew much hostility from his partners by extending some protection to former dignitaries whom the Iron Guard had arrested. One early incident opposed Antonescu to the Guard's magazine Buna Vestire, which accused him of leniency and was subsequently forced to change its editorial board. By then, the Legionary press was routinely claiming that he was obstructing revolution and aiming to take control of the Iron Guard, and that he had been transformed into a tool of Freemasonry (see Anti-Masonry). The political conflict coincided with major social challenges, including the influx of refugees from areas lost earlier in the year and a large-scale earthquake affecting Bucharest.

Disorder peaked in the last days of November 1940, when, after uncovering the circumstances of Codreanu's death, the fascist movement ordered retaliations against political figures previously associated with Carol, carrying out the Jilava Massacre, the assassinations of Nicolae Iorga and Virgil Madgearu, and several other acts of violence. As retaliation for this insubordination, Antonescu ordered the Army to resume control of the streets, unsuccessfully pressured Sima to have the assassins detained, ousted the Iron Guardist prefect of Bucharest Police Ștefan Zăvoianu, and ordered Legionary ministers to swear an oath to the Conducător. His condemnation of the killings was nevertheless limited and discreet, and, the same month, he joined Sima at a burial ceremony for Codreanu's newly discovered remains. The widening gap between the dictator and Sima's party resonated in Berlin. When, in December, Legionary Foreign Minister Mihail R. Sturdza obtained the replacement of Fabricius with Manfred Freiherr von Killinger, perceived as more sympathetic to the Iron Guard, Antonescu promptly took over leadership of the ministry, with the compliant diplomat Constantin Greceanu as his right hand. In Germany, such leaders of the Nazi Party as Heinrich Himmler, Baldur von Schirach and Joseph Goebbels threw their support behind the Legionaries, whereas Foreign Minister Joachim von Ribbentrop and the Wehrmacht stood by Antonescu. The latter group was concerned that any internal conflict would threaten Romania's oil industry, vital to the German war effort. The German leadership was by then secretly organizing Operation Barbarossa, the attack on the Soviet Union.

Legionary Rebellion and Operation Barbarossa

Antonescu's plan to act against his coalition partners in the event of further disorder hinged on Hitler's approval, a vague signal of which had been given during ceremonies confirming Romania's adherence to the Tripartite Pact. A decisive turn occurred when Hitler invited Antonescu and Sima both over for discussions: whereas Antonescu agreed, Sima stayed behind in Romania, probably plotting a coup d'état. While Hitler did not produce a clear endorsement for clamping down on Sima's party, he made remarks interpreted by their recipient as oblique blessings. On 14 January 1941 during a German-Romanian summit, Hitler informed Antonescu of his plans to invade the Soviet Union later that year and asked Romania to participate. By this time, Hitler had come to the conclusion that while Sima was ideologically closer to him, Antonescu was the more competent leader capable of ensuring stability in Romania while being committed to aligning his country with the Axis.

The Antonescu-Sima dispute erupted into violence in January 1941, when the Iron Guard instigated a series of attacks on public institutions and a pogrom, incidents collectively known as the "Legionary Rebellion." This came after the mysterious assassination of Major Döring, a German agent in Bucharest, which was used by the Iron Guard as a pretext to accuse the Conducător of having a secret anti-German agenda, and made Antonescu oust the Legionary Interior Minister, Constantin Petrovicescu, while closing down all of the Legionary-controlled "Romanianization" offices. Various other clashes prompted him to demand the resignation of all Police commanders who sympathized with the movement. After two days of widespread violence, during which Guardists killed some 120 Bucharest Jews, Antonescu sent in the Army, under the command of General Constantin Sănătescu. German officials acting on Hitler's orders, including the new Ambassador Manfred Freiherr von Killinger, helped Antonescu eliminate the Iron Guardists, but several of their lower-level colleagues actively aided Sima's subordinates. Goebbels was especially upset by the decision to support Antonescu, believing it to have been advantageous to "the Freemasons."

After the purge of the Iron Guard, Hitler kept his options open by granting political asylum to Sima—whom Antonescu's courts sentenced to death—and to other Legionaries in similar situations. The Guardists were detained in special conditions at Buchenwald and Dachau concentration camps. In parallel, Antonescu publicly obtained the cooperation of Codreanists, members of an Iron Guardist wing which had virulently opposed Sima, and whose leader was Codreanu's father Ion Zelea Codreanu. Antonescu again sought backing from the PNȚ and PNL to form a national cabinet, but his rejection of parliamentarism made the two groups refuse him.

Antonescu traveled to Germany and met Hitler on eight more occasions between June 1941 and August 1944. Such close contacts helped cement an enduring relationship between the two dictators, and Hitler reportedly came to see Antonescu as the only trustworthy person in Romania, and the only foreigner to consult on military matters. The American historian Gerhard Weinberg wrote that Hitler after first meeting Antonescu "...was greatly impressed by him; no other leader Hitler met other than Mussolini ever received such consistently favourable comments from the German dictator. Hitler even mustered the patience to listen to Antonescu's lengthy disquisitions on the glorious history of Romania and the perfidy of the Hungarians—a curious reversal for a man who was more accustomed to regaling visitors with tirades of his own." In later statements, Hitler offered praise to Antonescu's "breadth of vision" and "real personality." A remarkable aspect of the Hitler-Antonescu friendship was neither could speak others' language. Hitler only knew German while the only foreign language Antonescu knew was French, in which he was completely fluent. During their meetings, Antonescu spoke in French which was then translated into German by Hitler's translator Paul Schmidt and vice versa since Schmidt did not speak Romanian either. The German military presence increased significantly in early 1941, when, using Romania as a base, Hitler invaded the rebellious Kingdom of Yugoslavia and the Kingdom of Greece (see Balkans Campaign). In parallel, Romania's relationship with the United Kingdom, at the time the only major adversary of Nazi Germany, erupted into conflict: on 10 February 1941, British Premier Winston Churchill recalled His Majesty's Ambassador Reginald Hoare, and approved the blockade of Romanian ships in British-controlled ports. On 12 June 1941, during another summit with Hitler, Antonescu first learned of the "special" nature of Operation Barbarossa, namely, that the war against the Soviet Union was to be an ideological war to "annihilate" the forces of "Judeo-Bolshevism," a "war of extermination" to be fought without any mercy; Hitler even showed Antonescu a copy of the "Guidelines for the Conduct of the Troops in Russia" he had issued to his forces about the "special treatment" to be handed out to Soviet Jews. Antonescu completely accepted Hitler's ideas about Operation Barbarossa as a "race war" between the Aryans, represented by the Nordic Germans and Latin Romanians on the Axis side vs. the Slavs and Asians, commanded by the Jews on the Soviet side. Besides anti-Semitism, there was an extremely strong current of anti-Slavic and anti-Asian racism to Antonescu's remarks about the "Asiatic hordes" of the Red Army. The Asians Antonescu referred were the various Asian peoples of the Soviet Union, such as the Kazakhs, Kalmyks, Mongols, Uzbeks, Buryats, etc. During his summit with Hitler in June 1941, Antonescu told the Führer that he believed it was necessary to "once and for all" eliminate Russia as a power because the Russians were the most powerful Slavic nation and that as a Latin people, the Romanians had an inborn hatred of all Slavs and Jews. Antonescu went on to tell Hitler: "Because of its racial qualities, Romania can continue to play its role as an anti-Slavic buffer for the benefit of Germany." Ancel wrote that Romanian anti-Slavic racism differed from the German variety in that the Romanians had traditionally feared the Slavic peoples whereas the Germans had traditionally held the Slavic peoples in contempt. In Antonescu's mind, the Romanians as a Latin people had attained a level of civilization that the Slavs were nowhere close to, but theoretically the Slavic Russians and Ukrainians might be able to reach under Romanian auspices, through Antonescu's remarks to Hitler that "We must fight this race (i.e. the Slavs) resolutely" together, with the need for "colonization" of Transnistria, suggested that he did think this would happen in his own lifetime. Subsequently, the Romanians assigned to Barbarossa were to learn that as a Latin people, the Germans considered them to be their inferiors, albeit not as inferior as the Slavs, Asians and Jews who were viewed as untermenschen ("sub-humans"). Hitler's promise to Antonescu that after the war, the Germanic and Latin races would rule the world in a partnership turned out to be meaningless.

In June of that year, Romania joined the attack on the Soviet Union, led by Germany in coalition with Hungary, Finland, the State of Slovakia, the Kingdom of Italy, and the Independent State of Croatia. Antonescu had been made aware of the plan by German envoys, and supported it enthusiastically even before Hitler extended Romania an offer to participate. On 18 June 1941, Antonescu gave orders to his generals about "cleansing the ground" of Jews when Romanian forces entered Bessarabia and Bukovina. Right from the start, Antonescu proclaimed the war against the Soviet Union to be a "holy war", a "crusade" in the name of Eastern Orthodox faith and the Romanian race against the forces of "Judeo-Bolshevism". The propaganda of the Antonescu regime demonized everything Jewish as Antonescu believed that Communism was invented by the Jews, and all of the Soviet leaders were really Jews. Reflecting Antonescu's anti-Slavic feelings, despite the fact that the war was billed as a "crusade" in defence of Orthodoxy against "Judeo-Bolshevism", the war was not presented as a struggle to liberate the Orthodox Russians and Ukrainians from Communism; instead rule by "Judeo-Bolshevism" was portrayed as something brought about the innate moral inferiority of the Slavs, who thus needed to be ruled by the Germans and the Romanians. The Romanian force engaged formed a General Antonescu Army Group under the effective command of German general Eugen Ritter von Schobert. Romania's campaign on the Eastern Front began without a formal declaration of war, and was consecrated by Antonescu's statement: "Soldiers, I order you, cross the Prut River" (in reference to the Bessarabian border between Romania and post-1940 Soviet territory). A few days after this, a large-scale pogrom was carried out in Iași with Antonescu's agreement; thousands of Jews were killed in the bloody Iași pogrom. Antonescu had followed a generation of younger right-wing Romanian intellectuals led by Corneliu Zelea Codreanu who in the 1920s–30s had rejected the traditional Francophila of the Romanian elites and their adherence to Western notions of universal democratic values and human rights. Antonescu made it clear that his regime rejected the moral principles of the "demo-liberal world" and he saw the war as an ideological struggle between his spiritually pure "national-totalitarian regime" vs. "Jewish morality". Antonescu believed that the liberal humanist-democratic-capitalist values of the West and Communism were both invented by the Jews to destroy Romania. In a lengthy speech just before the war, Antonescu attacked democracy in the most violent terms as it allowed Jews equal rights and thus to undercut the Romanian "national idea". As such, Antonescu stated what was needed was a "new man" who would be "tough", "virile" and willing to fight for an ethnically and religiously "pure" Romania. Despite his quarrel with Sima, much of Antonescu's speech clearly reflected the influence of the ideas of the Iron Guard that Antonescu had absorbed in the 1930s. Antonescu's anti-Semitism and sexism went so far that he tacitly condoned the rape of Jewish women and girls in Bessarabia and northern Bukovinia by his forces under the grounds that he was going take away all of the property that the Jews had "stolen" from the Romanians, and as far he was concerned, Jewish females were just another piece of property. Since the Jewish women were going to exterminated anyway, Antonescu felt there was nothing wrong about letting his soldiers and gendarmes have "some fun" before shooting them.

After becoming the first Romanian to be granted the Knight's Cross of the Iron Cross, which he received from Hitler at their 6 August meeting in the Ukrainian city of Berdychiv, Ion Antonescu was promoted to Marshal of Romania by royal decree on 22 August, in recognition for his role in restoring the eastern frontiers of Greater Romania. In a report to Berlin, a German diplomat wrote that Marshal Antonescu had syphilis and that "among [Romanian] cavalry officers this disease is as widespread as a common cold is among German officers. The Marshal suffers from severe attacks of it every several months." Antonescu took one of his most debated decisions when, with Bessarabia's conquest almost complete, he committed Romania to Hitler's war effort beyond the Dniester—that is, beyond territory that had been part of Romania between the wars—and thrust deeper into Soviet territory, thus waging a war of aggression. On 30 August, Romania occupied a territory it deemed "Transnistria", formerly a part of the Ukrainian SSR (including the entire Moldavian ASSR and further territories). Like the decision to continue the war beyond Bessarabia, this earned Antonescu much criticism from the semi-clandestine PNL and PNȚ. Insofar as the war against the Soviet Union was a war to recover Bessarabia and northern Bukovina – both regions that been a part of Romania until June 1940 and that had Romanian majorities – the conflict had been very popular with the Romanian public opinion. But the idea of conquering Transnistria was not as that region had never been part of Romania, and a minority of the people were ethnic Romanian. Soon after the takeover, the area was assigned to a civil administration apparatus headed by Gheorghe Alexianu and became the site for the main component of the Holocaust in Romania: a mass deportation of the Bessarabian and Ukrainian Jews, followed later by transports of Romani Romanians and Jews from Moldavia proper (that is, the portions of Moldavia west of the Prut).

The accord over Transnistria's administration, signed in Tighina, also placed areas between the Dniester and the Dnieper under Romanian military occupation, while granting control over all resources to Germany. In September 1941, Antonescu ordered Romanian forces to take Odessa, a prize he badly wanted for reasons of prestige. Russians had traditionally been seen in Romania as brutal aggressors, and for Romanian forces to take a major Soviet city and one of the largest Black Sea ports like Odessa would be a sign of how far Romania had been "regenerated" under Antonescu's leadership. Much to Antonescu's intense fury, the Red Army were able to halt the Romanian offensive on Odessa and 24 September 1941 Antonescu had to reluctantly ask for the help of the Wehrmacht with the drive on Odessa. On 16 October 1941 Odessa fell to the German-Romanian forces. The Romanian losses had been so heavy that the area around Odessa was known to the Romanian Army as the Vale of Tears. Antonescu's anti-Semitism was sharpened by the Odessa fighting as he was convinced that the only reason why the Red Army had fought so fiercely around Odessa was that the average Russian soldier had been terrorized by bloodthirsty Jewish commissars into fighting hard. When Wilhelm Filderman wrote a letter to Antonescu complaining about the murder of Jews in Odessa, Antonescu wrote back: "Your Jews, who have become Soviet commissars, are driving Soviet soldiers in the Odessa region into a futile bloodbath, through horrendous terror techniques as the Russian prisoners themselves have admitted, simply to cause us heavy losses". Antonescu ended his letter with the claim that Russian Jewish commissars had savagely tortured Romanian POWs and that the entire Jewish community of Romania, Filderman included were morally responsible for all of the losses and sufferings of the Romanians around Odessa. In the fall of 1941, Antonescu planned to deport all of the Jews of the Regat, southern Bukovina and southern Transylvania into Transnistria as the prelude to killing them, but this operation was vetoed by Germany, who complained that Antonescu had not finished killing the Jews of Transnistria yet. This veto was largely motivated by bureaucratic politics, namely if Antonescu exterminated all of the Jews of Romania himself, there would be nothing for the SS and the Auswärtiges Amt to do. Killinger informed Antonescu that Germany would reduce its supplies of arms if Antonescu went ahead with his plans to deport the Jews of the Regat into Transnistria and told him he would be better off deporting the Jews to the death camps in Poland that the Germans were already busy building. Since Romania had almost no arms industry of its own and was almost entirely dependent upon weapons from Germany to fight the war, Antonescu had little choice, but to comply with Killinger's request.

Reversal of fortunes

The Romanian Army's inferior arms, insufficient armour and lack of training had been major concerns for the German commanders since before the start of the operation. One of the earliest major obstacles Antonescu encountered on the Eastern Front was the resistance of Odessa, a Soviet port on the Black Sea. Refusing any German assistance, he ordered the Romanian Army to maintain a two-month siege on heavily fortified and well-defended positions. The ill-equipped 4th Army suffered losses of some 100,000 men. Antonescu's popularity again rose in October, when the fall of Odessa was celebrated triumphantly with a parade through Bucharest's Arcul de Triumf, and when many Romanians reportedly believed the war was as good as won. In Odessa itself, the aftermath included a large-scale massacre of the Jewish population, ordered by the Marshal as retaliation for a bombing which killed a number of Romanian officers and soldiers (General Ioan Glogojeanu among them). The city subsequently became the administrative capital of Transnistria. According to one account, the Romanian administration planned to change Odessa's name to Antonescu. Antonescu's planned that once the war against the Soviet Union was won to invade Hungary to take back Transylvania and Bulgaria to take back the Dobruja with Antonescu being especially keen on the former. Antonescu planned on attacking Hungary to recover Transylvania at the first opportunity and regarded Romanian involvement on the Eastern Front in part as a way of proving to Hitler that Romania was a better German ally than Hungary, and thus deserving of German support when the planned Romanian-Hungarian war began. The Conducător had also created an intra-Axis alliance against Hungary along with Croatia and Slovakia.

As the Soviet Union recovered from the initial shock and slowed down the Axis offensive at the Battle of Moscow (October 1941 – January 1942), Romania was asked by its allies to contribute a larger number of troops. A decisive factor in Antonescu's compliance with the request appears to have been a special visit to Bucharest by Wehrmacht chief of staff Wilhelm Keitel, who introduced the Conducător to Hitler's plan for attacking the Caucasus (see Battle of the Caucasus). The Romanian force engaged in the war reportedly exceeded German demands. It came to around 500,000 troops and thirty actively involved divisions. As a sign of his satisfaction, Hitler presented his Romanian counterpart with a luxury car. On 7 December 1941, after reflecting on the possibility for Romania, Hungary and Finland to change their stance, the British government responded to repeated Soviet requests and declared war on all three countries. Following Japan's attack on Pearl Harbor and in compliance with its Axis commitment, Romania declared war on the United States within five days. These developments contrasted with Antonescu's own statement of 7 December: "I am an ally of the [German] Reich against [the Soviet Union], I am neutral in the conflict between Great Britain and Germany. I am for America against the Japanese."

A crucial change in the war came with the Battle of Stalingrad in June 1942 – February 1943, a major defeat for the Axis. Romania's armies alone lost some 150,000 men (either dead, wounded or captured) and more than half of the country's divisions were wiped out. 
The loss of two entire Romanian armies who all either killed or captured by the Soviets produced a major crisis in German-Romanian relations in the winter of 1943 with many people in the Romanian government for the first time questioning the wisdom of fighting on the side of the Axis. Outside of the elites, by 1943 the continuing heavy losses on the Eastern Front, anger at the contempt which the Wehrmacht treated their Romanian allies and declining living standards within Romania made the war unpopular with the Romanian people, and consequently the Conducător himself. The American historian Gerhard Weinberg wrote that: "The string of broken German promises of equipment and support, the disregard of warnings about Soviet offensive preparations, the unfriendly treatment of retreating Romanian units by German officers and soldiers and the general German tendency to blame their own miscalculations and disasters on their allies all combined to produce a real crisis in German-Romanian relations." For part of that interval, the Marshal had withdrawn from public life, owing to an unknown affliction, which is variously rumoured to have been a mental breakdown, a foodborne illness or a symptom of the syphilis he had contracted earlier in life. He is known to have been suffering from digestive problems, treating himself with food prepared by Marlene von Exner, an Austrian-born dietitian who moved into Hitler's service after 1943. 

Upon his return, Antonescu blamed the Romanian losses on German overseer Arthur Hauffe, whom Hitler agreed to replace. In parallel with the military losses, Romania was confronted with large-scale economic problems. Romania's oil was the Reich'''s only source of natural oil after the invasion of the Soviet Union in June 1941 to August 1944 (Germany also had synthetic oil plants operating from 1942 onwards), and as such for economic reasons, Romania was always treated as a major ally by Hitler.  While Germany monopolized Romania's exports, it defaulted on most of its payments. Like all countries whose exports to Germany, particularly in oil, exceeded imports from that country, Romania's economy suffered from Nazi control of the exchange rate (see Economy of Nazi Germany). On the German side, those directly involved in harnessing Romania's economic output for German goals were economic planners Hermann Göring and Walther Funk, together with Hermann Neubacher, the Special Representative for Economic Problems. A recurring problem for Antonescu was attempting to obtain payments for all of the oil he shipped to Germany while resisting German demands for increased oil production. The situation was further aggravated in 1942, as USAAF and RAF were able to bomb the oil fields in Prahova County (see Bombing of Romania in World War II, Operation Tidal Wave). Official sources from the following period amalgamate military and civilian losses of all kinds, which produces a total of 554,000 victims of the war. To improve the Romanian army's effectiveness, the Mareșal tank destroyer was developed starting in late 1942. Marshal Antonescu, after whom the vehicle was named, was involved in the project himself. The vehicle later influenced the development of the German Hetzer.Steven J. Zaloga, Tanks of Hitler’s Eastern Allies 1941–45, p. 31

In this context, the Romanian leader acknowledged that Germany was losing the war, and he therefore authorized his Deputy Premier and new Foreign Minister Mihai Antonescu to set up contacts with the Allies.Final Report, p. 252; Cioroianu, p. 51; Deletant, pp. 230–240, 341–344; Penkower, pp. 153, 161 In early 1943, Antonescu authorized his diplomats to contact British and American diplomats in Portugal and Switzerland to see if were possible for Romania to sign an armistice with the Western powers. The Romanian diplomats were informed that no armistice was possible until an armistice was signed with the Soviet Union, a condition Antonescu rejected. In parallel, he allowed the PNȚ and the PNL to engage in parallel talks with the Allies at various locations in neutral countries.Deletant, pp. 75, 231–240, 341–344; Roper, pp. 8, 14 The discussions were strained by the Western Allies' call for an unconditional surrender, over which the Romanian envoys bargained with Allied diplomats in Sweden and Egypt (among them the Soviet representatives Nikolai Vasilevich Novikov and Alexandra Kollontai). Antonescu was also alarmed by the possibility of war being carried on Romanian territory, as had happened in Italy after Operation Avalanche. The events also prompted hostile negotiations aimed at toppling Antonescu, and involving the two political parties, the young monarch, diplomats and soldiers.Deletant, pp. 237–240, 343–344; Roper, p. 14 A major clash between Michael and Antonescu took place during the first days of 1943, when the 21-year-old monarch used his New Year's address on national radio to part with the Axis war effort.

Ouster and arrest

In March 1944, the Soviet Red Army broke the Southern Bug and Dniester fronts, advancing on Bessarabia. This came just as Field Marshal Henry Maitland Wilson, the British Allied commander of the Mediterranean theatre, presented Antonescu with an ultimatum. After a new visit to Germany and a meeting with Hitler, Antonescu opted to continue fighting alongside the remaining Axis states, a decision which he later claimed was motivated by Hitler's promise to allow Romania possession of Northern Transylvania in the event of an Axis victory. Upon his return, the Conducător oversaw a counteroffensive which stabilized the front on a line between Iași and Chișinău to the north and the lower Dniester to the east. This normalized his relations with Nazi German officials, whose alarm over the possible loss of an ally had resulted in the Margarethe II plan, an adapted version of the Nazi takeover in Hungary.Chant, p. 124; Deletant, pp. 234–235, 342

However, Antonescu's non-compliance with the terms of Wilson's ultimatum also had drastic effects on Romania's ability to exit the war. By then, Antonescu was conceiving of a separate peace with the Western Allies,Deletant, p. 231; White, p. 158 while maintaining contacts with the Soviets. In parallel, the mainstream opposition movement came to establish contacts with the Romanian Communist Party (PCR), which, although minor numerically, gained importance for being the only political group to be favored by Soviet leader Joseph Stalin. On the PCR side, the discussions involved Lucrețiu Pătrășcanu and later Emil Bodnăraș.Deletant, pp. 238–240, 343–344 Another participating group at this stage was the old Romanian Social Democratic Party.

Large-scale Allied bombings of Bucharest took place in spring 1944, while the Soviet Red Army approached Romanian borders. The Battle for Romania began in late summer: while German commanders Johannes Frießner and Otto Wöhler of the Army Group South Ukraine attempted to hold Bukovina, Soviet Steppe Front leader Rodion Malinovsky stormed into the areas of Moldavia defended by Petre Dumitrescu's troops. In reaction, Antonescu attempted to stabilize the front on a line between Focșani, Nămoloasa and Brăila, deep inside Romanian territory. On 5 August, he visited Hitler one final time in Kętrzyn. On this occasion, the German leader reportedly explained that his people had betrayed the Nazi cause, and asked him if Romania would go on fighting (to which Antonescu reportedly answered in vague terms). After Soviet Foreign Minister Vyacheslav Molotov more than once stated that the Soviet Union was not going to require Romanian subservience, the factions opposing Antonescu agreed that the moment had come to overthrow him, by carrying out the Royal Coup of 23 August.Ancel (2005 a), p. 321; Bucur (2004), pp. 173–176; Chant, pp. 84–85, 124–125, 303; Cioroianu, pp. 50–55; Deletant, pp. 3–4, 241–246, 265–266, 343–346; Gella, p. 172; Guran & Ștefan, p. 112; Ioanid, pp. 235–236; Kelso, p. 129; Kenney, p. 93; Kent, p. 52; King, p. 94; Morgan, p. 188; Nicholls, pp. 6, 166–167; Roper, pp. 13–15; Weber, pp. 152–154, 158–159; White, p. 158 On that day, the sovereign asked Antonescu to meet him in the royal palace building, where he presented him with a request to take Romania out of its Axis alliance.Deletant, pp. 241–242; Roper, p. 14 The Conducător refused, and was promptly arrested by soldiers of the guard, being replaced as Premier with General Constantin Sănătescu, who presided over a national government.Cioroianu, p. 55; Deletant, pp. 242–243; Roper, p. 14

The new Romanian authorities declared peace with the Allies and advised the population to greet Soviet troops. On 25 August, as Bucharest was successfully defending itself against German retaliations, Romania declared war on Nazi Germany. The events disrupted German domination in the Balkans, putting a stop to the Maibaum offensive against Yugoslav Partisans. The coup was nevertheless a unilateral move, and, until the signature of an armistice on 12 September,Final Report, p. 316; Cioroianu, p. 51; Deletant, pp. 247–248; Kelso, p. 130; Nicholls, pp. 167, 225 the country was still perceived as an enemy by the Soviets, who continued to take Romanian soldiers as prisoners of war. In parallel, Hitler reactivated the Iron Guardist exile, creating a Sima-led government in exile that did not survive the war's end in Europe.

Placed in the custody of PCR militants, Ion Antonescu spent the interval at a house in Bucharest's Vatra Luminoasă quarter.Deletant, pp. 243–244, 345–346 He was afterward handed to the Soviet occupation forces, who transported him to Moscow, together with his deputy Mihai Antonescu, Governor of Transnistria Gheorghe Alexianu, Defense Minister Constantin Pantazi, Gendarmerie commander Constantin Vasiliu and Bucharest Police chief Mircea Elefterescu.Deletant, p. 244 They were subsequently kept in luxurious detention at a mansion nearby the city,Cioroianu, p. 296; Deletant, pp. 244, 246 and guarded by SMERSH, a special counter-intelligence body answering directly to Stalin. Shortly after Germany surrendered in May 1945, the group was moved to Lubyanka prison. There, Antonescu was interrogated and reputedly pressured by SMERSH operatives, among them Viktor Semyonovich Abakumov, but transcripts of their conversations were never sent back to Romania by the Soviet authorities.Deletant, pp. 246, 346 Later research noted that the main issues discussed were the German-Romanian alliance, the war on the Soviet Union, the economic toll on both countries, and Romania's participation in the Holocaust (defined specifically as crimes against "peaceful Soviet citizens"). At some point during this period, Antonescu attempted suicide in his quarters. He was returned to Bucharest in spring 1946 and held in Jilava prison. He was subsequently interrogated by prosecutor Avram Bunaciu, to whom he complained about the conditions of his detainment, contrasting them with those in Moscow, while explaining that he was a vegetarian and demanding a special diet.

Trial and execution
In May 1946, Ion Antonescu was prosecuted at the first in a series of People's Tribunals, on charges of war crimes, crimes against the peace and treason.Final Report, pp. 317–331; Cioroianu, pp. 295–296; Deletant, pp. 245–261, 346–350; Frankowski, pp. 218–219 The tribunals had first been proposed by the PNȚ, and were comparable to the Nuremberg Trials in Allied-occupied Germany.Final Report, pp. 316, 319–320, 331; Deletant, pp. 247–248, 261 The Romanian legislative framework was drafted by coup participant Pătrășcanu, a PCR member who had been granted leadership of the Justice Ministry. Despite the idea having earned support from several sides of the political spectrum, the procedures were politicized in a sense favourable to the PCR and the Soviet Union,Final Report, pp. 313–331; Cioroianu, pp. 295–296; Deletant, pp. 245–261; Frankowski, pp. 218–219 and posed a legal problem for being based on ex post facto decisions. The first such local trial took place in 1945, resulting in the sentencing of Iosif Iacobici, Nicolae Macici, Constantin Trestioreanu and other military commanders directly involved in planning or carrying out the Odessa massacre.

Antonescu was represented by Constantin Paraschivescu-Bălăceanu and Titus Stoica, two public defenders whom he had first consulted with a day before the procedures were initiated. The prosecution team, led by Vasile Stoican, and the panel of judges, presided over by Alexandru Voitinovici, were infiltrated by PCR supporters. Both consistently failed to admit that Antonescu's foreign policies were overall dictated by Romania's positioning between Germany and the Soviet Union.Final Report, pp. 320–321; Deletant, p. 248 Nevertheless, and although references to the mass murders formed just 23% of the indictment and corpus of evidence (ranking below charges of anti-Soviet aggression), the procedures also included Antonescu's admission of and self-exculpating take on war crimes, including the deportations to Transnistria.Final Report, pp. 240–241, 252, 321–322; Achim, p. 168; Deletant, pp. 73, 252–255, 261, 276–277; Kelso, p. 97 They also evidence his awareness of the Odessa massacre, accompanied by his claim that few of the deaths were his direct responsibility. One notable event at the trial was a testimony by PNȚ leader Iuliu Maniu. Reacting against the aggressive tone of other accusers, Maniu went on record saying: "We [Maniu and Antonescu] were political adversaries, not cannibals." Upon leaving the bench, Maniu walked toward Antonescu and shook his hand.Deletant, pp. 255–256, 348

Ion Antonescu was found guilty of the charges. This verdict was followed by two sets of appeals, which claimed that the restored and amended 1923 Constitution did not offer a framework for the People's Tribunals and prevented capital punishment during peacetime, while noting that, contrary to the armistice agreement, only one power represented within the Allied Commission had supervised the tribunal. They were both rejected within six days, in compliance with a legal deadline on the completion of trials by the People's Tribunals. King Michael subsequently received pleas for clemency from Antonescu's lawyer and his mother, and reputedly considered asking the Allies to reassess the case as part of the actual Nuremberg Trials, taking Romanian war criminals into foreign custody. Subjected to pressures by the new Soviet-backed Petru Groza executive, he issued a decree in favour of execution. Together with his co-defendants Mihai Antonescu, Alexianu and Vasiliu, the former Conducător was executed by a military firing squad on 1 June 1946. Ion Antonescu's supporters circulated false rumours that regular soldiers had refused to fire at their commander, and that the squad was mostly composed of Jewish policemen. Another apologetic claim insists that he himself ordered the squad to shoot, but footage of the event has proven it false. However, he did refuse a blindfold and raised his hat in salute once the order was given. The execution site, some distance away from the locality of Jilava and the prison fort, was known as Valea Piersicilor ("Valley of the Peach Trees").Cioroianu, p. 296; Deletant, p. 259 His final written statement was a letter to his wife, urging her to withdraw into a convent, while stating the belief that posterity would reconsider his deeds and accusing Romanians of being "ungrateful".

Ideology

Ethnic nationalism and expansionism

Antonescu's policies were motivated, in large part, by ethnic nationalism. A firm believer in the restoration of Greater Romania as the union of lands inhabited by ethnic Romanians, he never reconciled himself to Hungary's incorporation of Northern Transylvania. Although Hungary and Romania were technically allied through the Axis system, their relationship was always tense, and marked by serious diplomatic incidents. The Romanian leader kept contacts with representatives of ethnic Romanian communities directly affected by the Second Vienna Award, including Transylvanian Greek-Catholic clergy. Another aspect of Antonescu's nationalist policies was evidenced after the Balkans Campaign. Antonescu's Romania did not partake in the military action, but laid a claim to the territories in eastern Vojvodina (western Banat) and the Timok Valley, home to a sizeable Romanian community. Reportedly, Germany's initial designs of granting Vojvodina to Hungary enhanced the tensions between Antonescu and Miklós Horthy to the point where war between the two countries became a possibility. Such incidents made Germany indefinitely prolong its occupation of the region. The Romanian authorities issued projects for an independent Macedonia with autonomy for its Aromanian communities, while an official memorandum on the Timok Valley, approved by Antonescu, made mention of "Romanian" areas "from Timok [...] to Salonika". The Conducător also maintained contacts with Aromanian fascists in Axis-occupied Greece, awarding refuge to Alcibiades Diamandi and Nicola Matussi of the Roman Legion, whose pro-Romanian policies had brought them into conflict with other Aromanian factions.Conducător Antonescu thought Hitler willing to revise his stance on Northern Transylvania, and claimed to have obtained the German leader's agreement, using it to justify participation on the Eastern Front after the recovery of Bessarabia.Final Report, pp. 171–172, 253; Deletant, pp. 62, 85–87, 93; Trașcă, pp. 379–380. However, transcripts of the Hitler-Antonescu conversations do not validate his interpretation. Another version has it that Hitler sent Antonescu a letter informing him that Bessarabia's political status still ultimately depended on German decisions. In one of his letters to Hitler, Antonescu himself stated his anti-communist ideological motivation: "I confirm that I will pursue operations in the east to the end against that great enemy of civilization, of Europe, and of my country: Russian Bolshevism [...] I will not be swayed by anyone not to extend this military cooperation into new territory." Antonescu's ideological perspective blended national sentiment with generically Christian and particularly Romanian Orthodox traits. British historian Arnold D. Harvey writes that while this ideology seems a poor match with Nazi doctrine, especially its anti-religious elements, "It seems that Hitler was not even perturbed by the militant Christian orientation of the Antonescu regime".

It is also possible that, contrary to Antonescu's own will, Hitler viewed the transfer of Transnistria as compensation for the Transylvanian areas, and that he therefore considered the matter closed. According to the Romanian representative in Berlin, Raoul Bossy, various German and Hungarian officials recommended the extension of permanent Romanian rule into Transnistria, as well as into Podolia, Galicia and Pokuttya, in exchange for delivering the whole of Transylvania to Hungary (and relocating its ethnic Romanian majority to the new provinces). American political scientist Charles King writes: "There was never any attempt to annex the occupied territory [of Transnistria], for it was generally considered by the Romanian government to be a temporary buffer zone between Greater Romania and the Soviet front line." At his 1946 trial, Antonescu claimed that Transnistria had been occupied to prevent Romania being caught in a "pincer" between Germany's Drang nach Osten and the Volksdeutsch communities to the east, while denying charges of having exploited the region for Romania's benefit.

Romanian historian Lucian Boia believes that Ion Antonescu may have nevertheless had expansionist goals to the east, and that he implicitly understood Operation Barbarossa as a tool for containing Slavic peoples. Similar verdicts are provided by other researchers. Another Romanian historian, Ottmar Trașcă, argues that Antonescu did not wish to annex the region "at least until the end of the war", but notes that Antonescu's own statements make reference to its incorporation in the event of a victory. In addition to early annexation plans to the Southern Bug (reportedly confessed to Bossy in June 1941), the Conducător is known to have presented his ministers with designs for the region's colonization. The motivation he cited was alleged malnutrition among Romanian peasants, to which he added: "I'll take this population, I'll lead it into Transnistria, where I shall give it all the land it requires". Several nationalists sympathetic to Antonescu acclaimed the extension of Romanian rule into Transnistria, which they understood as permanent.

Antisemitism and antiziganism

A recurring element in Antonescu's doctrines is racism, and in particular antisemitism. This was linked to his sympathy for ethnocratic ideals, and complemented by his statements in favor of "integral nationalism" and "Romanianism". Like other far right Romanians, he saw a Jewish presence behind liberal democracy, and believed in the existence of Judeo-Masonry. His earliest thoughts on Codreanu's ideology criticize the Legionary leader for advocating "brutal measures" in dealing with the "invasion of Jews", and instead propose "the organization of Romanian classes" as a method for reaching the same objective. Politician Aureliu Weiss, who met General Antonescu during that interval, recalled that, although antisemitic "to the core", he was capable of restraint in public. According to historian Mihail Ionescu, the Conducător was not averse to the Iron Guard's "Legionary principles", but wanted antisemitism to be "applied in an orderly fashion", as opposed to Horia Sima's revolutionary ways. Historian Ioan Scurtu believes that, during the Legionary Rebellion, Antonescu deliberately waited before stepping in, in order for the Guard to be "profoundly discredited" and for himself to be perceived as a "savior". In April 1941, he let his ministers know that he was considering letting "the mob" deal with the Jews, "and after the slaughter, I will restore order." Lucian Boia notes that the Romanian leader was indeed motivated by antisemitic beliefs, but that these need to be contextualized in order to understand what separates Antonescu from Hitler in terms of radicalism. However, various other researchers assess that, by aligning himself with Hitler before and during Operation Barbarossa, Antonescu implicitly agreed with his thoughts on the "Jewish Question", choosing racial over religious antisemitism.Final Report, pp. 116, 127–128, 181–182, 184, 202–203, 323, 325, 383, 385; Deletant, pp. 1, 128–129; Trașcă, pp. 388–389. According to Harvey, the Iași pogrom made the Germans "evidently willing to accept that organized Christianity in Romania was very different from what it was in Germany".

Antonescu was a firm believer in the conspiracy theory of "Jewish Bolshevism", according to which all Jews were supporters of communism and the Soviet Union.Final Report, pp. 101, 209–211, 243–247, 384; Deletant, pp. 15–20, 116–120, 128–129, 138, 140–141, 210–211, 259, 276–277, 318; Ioanid, pp. 232–233; Penkower, p. 182; Trașcă, pp. 387–389. His arguments on the matter involved a spurious claim that, during the 1940 retreat from Bessarabia, the Jews had organized themselves and attacked Romanian soldiers.Final Report, pp. 82–86, 247, 285; Deletant, pp. 15–20, 140–142, 318; Ioanid, p. 232; Trașcă, p. 387. Several researchers mention violence committed by retreating Romanian troops against the Bessarabian Jews (Browning, pp. 275–276; Deletant, p. 18; King p. 93) or the retaliatory Dorohoi pogrom (Final Report, pp. 84–86). In part, this notion exaggerated unilateral reports of enthusiasm among the marginalized Jews upon the arrival of Red Army troops. In a summer 1941 address to his ministers, Antonescu stated: "The Satan is the Jew. [Ours] is a battle of life and death. Either we win and the world will be purified, either they win and we will become their slaves." At around the same time, he envisaged the ethnic cleansing ("cleaning out") of Jews from the eastern Romanian-held territories.Final Report, pp. 120–122, 127–142, 169, 175–177, 321; Ancel (2005 a), pp. 15–19, 291, 402; Deletant, pp. 79, 116–118, 127–130, 142–150, 155–156, 319; Polonsky, p. 27. The term used by Mihai Antonescu in his recommendations to the Romanian administrators is "ethnic purification", as confinement to "labor camps, where Jews and other foreigners with doubtful attitudes will not be able to exercise their prejudicial influences." (Ioanid, p. 232); Achim, p. 167; Browning, p. 276; Trașcă, pp. 387–389. However, as early as February 1941, Antonescu was also contemplating the ghettoization of all Jewish Romanians, as an early step toward their expulsion. In this context, Antonescu frequently depicted Jews as a disease or a poison. After the Battle of Stalingrad, he encouraged the army commanders to resist the counteroffensive, as otherwise the Soviets "will bring Bolshevism to the country, wipe out the entire leadership stratum, impose the Jews on us, and deport masses of our people."

Ion Antonescu's antiziganism manifested itself as the claim that some or all Romani people, specifically nomadic ones, were given to criminal behavior. The regime did not act consistently on this belief: in various cases, those deported had close relatives drafted into the Romanian Army. Although racist slogans targeting Romani people had been popularized by the Iron Guard, it was only under Antonescu's unchallenged rule that solving the "Gypsy problem" became official policy and antiziganist measures were enforced. After a February 1941 inspection, Antonescu singled out Bucharest's Romani community for alleged offences committed during the blackout, and called on his ministers to present him with solutions. Initially, he contemplated sending all Romani people he considered undesirable to the inhospitable Bărăgan Plain, to join the ranks of a local community of manual labourers. In 1942, he commissioned the Romanian Central Institute for Statistics to compile a report on Romani demography, which, in its edited form, provided scientifically racist conclusions, warning the Conducător about alleged Romani-Romanian miscegenation in rural Romania. In doing so, Antonescu offered some credit to a marginal and pseudoscientific trend in Romanian sociology, which, basing itself on eugenic theories, recommended the marginalization, deportation or compulsory sterilization of the Romani people, whose numeric presence it usually exaggerated. Among those who signed the report was demographer Sabin Manuilă, who saw the Romani presence as a major racial problem. The exact effect of the report's claims on Antonescu is uncertain.

Fascism and conservatism

There is a historiographic dispute about whether Ion Antonescu's regime was fascist or more generically right-wing authoritarian, itself integrated within a larger debate about the aspects and limits of fascism. Israeli historian of fascism Zeev Sternhell describes Antonescu, alongside his European counterparts Pierre-Étienne Flandin, Francisco Franco, Miklós Horthy, François de La Rocque, Philippe Pétain and Italian King Victor Emmanuel III, as a "conservative", noting that all of them "were not deceived by a [fascist] propaganda trying to place them in the same category [as the fascist movements]." A similar verdict is provided by German historian of Europe Hagen Schulze, who views Horthy, Franco and the Romanian leader alongside Portugal's Estado Novo theorist António de Oliveira Salazar and Second Polish Republic founder Józef Piłsudski, as rulers of "either purely military dictatorships, or else authoritarian governments run by civilian politicians", and thus a category apart from the leaders of "Fascist states." For Schulze, the defining elements of such governments is the presence of a "conservative establishment" which ensured "social stability" by extending the control of a "traditional state" (thus effectively blocking "revolutionary suggestions" from the far left and the far right alike). The term "conservative autocrat" is used in relation to the Conducător by British political theorist Roger Griffin, who attributes to the Iron Guard the position of a subservient fascist movement, while others identify Antonescu's post-1941 rule as a military rather than a fascist dictatorship. Several other scholars prefer "conservative" as a defining term for Antonescu's policies.Veiga, pp. 281–283, 290, 296, 305, 327; White, p. 158. Antonescu described himself as "by fate a dictator", and explained that his policies were "militaristic" or, on one occasion, "national-totalitarian".

Nevertheless, other historians theorize a synthesis of fascist and conservative elements, performed by Antonescu and other European leaders of his day. Routledge's 2002 Companion to Fascism and the Far Right uses the terms "para-fascist" to define Antonescu, adding: "generally regarded as an authoritarian conservative [Antonescu] incorporated fascism into his regime, in the shape of the Iron Guard, rather than embodying fascism himself." "Para-fascist" is also used by Griffin, to denote both Antonescu and Carol II. American historian of fascism Robert Paxton notes that, like Salazar, Romania's dictator crushed a competing fascist movement, "after copying some of [its] techniques of popular mobilization." Political scientists John Gledhill and Charles King discuss the Iron Guard as Romania's "indigenous fascist movement", remark that Antonescu "adopted much of the ideology of the Guardists", and conclude that the regime he led was "openly fascist". References to the fascist traits of Antonescu's dictatorship are also made by other researchers.Final Report, pp. 115–116, 237, 313, 316, 322–324, 384–385; Achim, pp. 167, 180; Ancel (2005 b), pp. 234, 245, 255; Boia, pp. 118–119; Gella, pp. 171, 172, 173; Ioanid, pp. 232, 235, 237–238, 244, 245; Kenney, pp. 92–93; Nicholls, p. 6.

The synthetic aspect of Antonescu's rule is discussed in detail by various authors. British historian Dennis Deletant, who notes that the fascist label relies on both Antonescu's adoption of some fascist "trappings" and the "dichotomy of wartime and postwar evaluation" of his regime, also notes that post-1960 interpretations "do more to explain his behaviour than the preceding orthodoxy." Deletant contrasts the lack of "mass political party or ideology" with the type of rule associated with Nazism or Italian fascism. British-born sociologist and political analyst Michael Mann writes: "The authoritarian regimes of Antonescu [...] and Franco [...] purported to be 'traditional', but actually their fascist-derived corporatism was a new immanent ideology of the right." Another distinct view is held by Romanian-born historian of ideas Juliana Geran Pilon, who describes Romania's "military fascist regime" as a successor to Iron Guardist "mystical nationalism", while mentioning that Antonescu's "national ideology was rather more traditionally militaristic and conservative."

Power base, administration and propaganda

In theory, Antonescu's policies had at least one revolutionary aspect. The leader himself claimed: "I want to introduce a patriotic, heroic, military-typed education, because economic education and all the others follow from it." According to Boia, his arrival in power was explicitly meant to "regenerate" Romania, and his popularity hinged on his being perceived as a "totalitarian model" and a "saviour" figure, like Corneliu Zelea Codreanu and Carol II before him. The "providential" and "saviour" themes are also emphasized by historian Adrian Majuru, who notes that Antonescu both adopted such ideals and criticized Carol for failing to live up to them. Seeing his rule as legitimized by the national interest,Deletant, p. 69 the general is also known to have referred to political pluralism as poltronerie ("poltroonishness"). Accordingly, Antonescu formally outlawed all political forces in February 1941, codifying penal labor as punishment for most public forms of political expression. In Deletant's assessment, his regenerative program was more declarative than factual, and contradicted by Antonescu's own decision to allow the informal existence of some opposition forces. At the same time, some historians believe his monopolizing of power in the name of a German alliance turned Romania into either a "puppet state" of Hitler or one of Germany's "satellite" governments. However, Deletant notes: "Romania retained her sovereignty throughout the period of the alliance [with Nazi Germany]. [...] Antonescu had, of course, his own country's interests uppermost in his mind, but in following Hitler, he served the Nazi cause." He describes Romania's contribution to the war as that of "a principal ally of Germany", as opposed to a "minor Axis satellite."

Although he assigned an unimportant role to King Michael, Antonescu took steps to increase the monarchy's prestige, personally inviting Carol's estranged wife, Queen Mother Helen, to return home. However, his preferred military structures functioned in cooperation with a bureaucracy inherited from the National Renaissance Front.Final Report, pp. 31, 43, 117, 384–385 According to historian of fascism Philip Morgan: "Antonescu probably wanted to create, or perpetuate, something like Carol's front organization." Much of his permanent support base comprised former National Christian Party members, to the point where he was seen as successor to Octavian Goga. While maintaining a decorative replacement for Parliament—known as Adunarea Obștească Plebiscitară a Națiunii Române ("The General Plebiscitary Assembly of the Romanian Nation") and convoked only twice— he took charge of hierarchical appointments, and personally drafted new administrative projects. In 1941, he disestablished participative government in localities and counties, replacing it with a corporatist structure appointed by prefects whom he named. In stages between August and October 1941, he instituted civilian administration of Transnistria under Governor Gheorghe Alexianu, whose status he made equivalent to that of a cabinet minister. Similar measures were taken in Bukovina and Bessarabia (under Governors Corneliu Calotescu and Gheorghe Voiculescu, respectively). Antonescu strictly relied on the chain of command, and his direct orders to the Army overrode civilian hierarchies. This system allowed room for endemic political corruption and administrative confusion. The Romanian leader also tolerated a gradual loss of authority over the German communities in Romania, in particular the Transylvanian Saxon and Banat Swabian groups, in agreement with Hitler's views on the Volksdeutsche. This trend was initiated by Saxon Nazi activist Andreas Schmidt in cooperation with the Volksdeutsche Mittelstelle, resulting in de facto self-governance under a Nazi system which was also replicated among the 130,000 Black Sea Germans of Transnistria. Many young German Romanian men opted to join the Schutzstaffel as early as 1940 and, in 1943, an accord between Antonescu and Hitler automatically sent ethnic Germans of recruitable age into the Wehrmacht.

The regime was characterized by the leader's attempts to regulate even remote aspects of public life, including relations between the sexes. He imposed drastic penalties for misdemeanors, and the legal use of capital punishment was extended to an unprecedented level. He personally set standards for nightclub programs, for the length of skirts and for women's use of bicycles, while forcing all men to wear coats in public. His wife Maria was a patron of state-approved charitable organizations, initially designed to compete with successful Iron Guardist ventures such as Ajutorul Legionar. According to Romanian-born gender studies academic Maria Bucur, although the regime allowed women "to participate in the war effort on the front in a more regularized, if still marginal, fashion", the general tone was sexist.

The administrative apparatus included official press and propaganda sectors, which moved rapidly from constructing Carol's personality cult to doing the same for the new military leader: journals Universul and Timpul, as well as Camil Petrescu's România magazine, were particularly active in this process. Some other such venues were Porunca Vremii, Nichifor Crainic's Sfarmă-Piatră, as well as all the seemingly independent newspapers and some ten new periodicals the government founded for this purpose. Among the individual journalists involved in propaganda were Crainic, Petrescu, Stelian Popescu,Final Report, p. 97 and Curentul editor Pamfil Șeicaru (the Conducător purposefully ignored support from Carol's former adviser, corporatist economist and newspaperman Mihail Manoilescu, whom he reportedly despised). Much of the propaganda produced during the Antonescu era supported the antisemitic theses put forth by the Conducător. Antisemitism was notable and virulent at the level of Romanian Army units addressing former Soviet citizens in occupied lands, and reflected the regime's preference for the ethnic slur jidani (akin to "kikes" or "Yids" in English). The religious aspect of anti-communism surfaced in such venues, which frequently equated Operation Barbarossa with a holy war or a crusade.Trașcă, p. 379 Romania's other enemies were generally treated differently: Antonescu himself issued objections to the anti-British propaganda of explicitly pro-Nazi papers such as Porunca Vremii. A special segment of Antonescu's post-1941 propaganda was Codrenist: it revisited the Iron Guard's history to minimize Sima's contributions and to depict him as radically different from Codreanu.

Antonescu and The Holocaust

Iași pogrom

Three weeks after gaining power and inaugurating the National Legionary regime, Ion Antonescu declared to Italian interviewers at La Stampa that solving the "Jewish Question" was his pressing concern, and that he considered himself "haunted" by the large Jewish presence in Moldavian towns. Antonescu's crimes against the Jewish population were inaugurated by new racial discrimination laws: urban Jewish property was expropriated, Jews were banned from performing a wide range of occupations and forced to provide community work for the state (muncă de interes obștesc) instead of the inaccessible military service, mixed Romanian-Jewish marriages were forbidden and many Jews, primarily those from strategic areas such as Ploiești, were confined to internment camps. The expulsion of Jewish professionals from all walks of life was also carried out in the National Legionary period, and enforced after the Legionary Rebellion. After a post-Legionary hiatus, "Romanianization" commissions resumed their work under the supervision of a National Center, and their scope was extended.

Often discussed as a prelude to the Holocaust in Romania and in connection with Antonescu's views on "Jewish Bolshevism", the Iași pogrom occurred just days after the start of Operation Barbarossa, and was partly instigated, partly tolerated by the authorities in Bucharest. For a while before the massacre, these issued propaganda claiming that the Jews in Iași, whose numbers had been increased by forced evictions from smaller localities, were actively helping Soviet bombers find their targets through the blackout and plotting against the authorities, with Antonescu himself ordering that the entire community be expelled from the city on such grounds.Final Report, pp. 120–123, 200, 208–209, 244, 329; Ancel (2005 a), pp. 11–12, 40–46, 49–51, 57–58, 69–70, 73, 100–110, 130, 161–163, 169, 274, 325; Deletant, pp. 130–134, 138 The discourse appealed to local antisemites, whose murderous rampage, carried out with the officials' complicity, resulted in several thousand deaths among Jewish men, women and children.Final Report, pp. 120–126, 200, 204, 208–209, 243–244, 285–286, 315, 323, 323, 327–329; Ancel (2005 a), passim; Browning, pp. 276–277; Deletant, pp. 133–140; Ioanid, pp. 233, 236; Laqueur, p. 206; Penkower, p. 149; Polonsky, p. 27; Veiga, pp. 300, 312; Weber, p. 167

In the aftermath of the pogrom, thousands of survivors were loaded into the so-called "death trains". These overcrowded and sealed Romanian Railways cattle wagons circled the countryside in the extreme heat of the summer, and periodically stopped to unload the dead.Final Report, pp. 125–126, 209, 295; Ancel (2005 a), pp. 12, 130, 151–344; Deletant, pp. 134–137, 317 At least 4,000 people died during the initial massacre and the subsequent transports. Varied estimates of the Iași massacre and related killings place the total number of Jews killed at 8,000, 10,000, 12,000 or 14,000.Final Report, pp. 126, 382; Ancel (2005 a), pp. 11, 15, 390–393; Deletant, p. 316; Weber, p. 167 Some assistance in their murder was provided by units of the German XXXth Army Corps, a matter which later allowed the authorities to shift blame from themselves and from Antonescu—who was nonetheless implicated by the special orders he had released.Final Report, pp. 121–125, 208–209; Ancel (2005 a), pp. 11–12, 15–19, 22–23, 26–33, 40–46, 49–51, 57–58, 69–70, 73, 100–110, 130, 141–154, 158–169, 238–247, 274, 290–293, 325, 422–427; Deletant, pp. 137–140, 252, 276, 317; Ioanid, p. 233; Trașcă, pp. 398–399. According to Ioanid, German participation in the Romanian-coordinated operation resulted in, at most, 3,000 of the deaths of a total 10,000 to 12,000. The complicity of the Special Intelligence Service and its director Eugen Cristescu was also advanced as a possibility. The subsequent attempts at a cover-up included omissive explanations given by the central authorities to foreign diplomats and rewriting official records.

Transnistria

Right upon setting up camp in Bessarabia and Northern Bukovina, Romanian troops joined the Wehrmacht and the Schutzstaffel-organized Einsatzgruppen in mass shootings of Bessarabian and Ukrainian Jews,Final Report, pp. 66, 125, 128–134, 141, 175–177; Ancel (2005 a), pp. 21, 361–365, 402; Browning, pp. 275–277; Deletant, pp. 127–128, 143–149, 275, 314, 319–321; Ioanid, p. 233; Penkower, p. 149 resulting in the deaths of 10,000 to 20,000 people. Scholar Christopher R. Browning compares these killings with similar atrocities perpetrated by locals in Reichskommissariat Ukraine, Lithuania and Latvia (see Holocaust in Latvia, Holocaust in Lithuania, Holocaust in Ukraine). From then on, as the fighting troops progressed over the Dniester, the local administration deported large numbers of Jews into the fighting zone, in hopes that they would be exterminated by the Germans.Final Report, pp. 65–66, 134–136, 176–177, 244–245, 383; Deletant, pp. 128, 142–152, 171, 321–322; Polonsky, pp. 27–28 Antonescu himself stated: "I am in favor of expelling the Jews from Bessarabia and [Northern] Bukovina to the other side of the border [...]. There is nothing for them to do here and I don't mind if we appear in history as barbarians [...]. There has never been a time more suitable in our history to get rid of the Jews, and if necessary, you are to make use of machine guns against them." He also explained that his aim was: "the policy of purification of the Romanian race, and I will not give way before any obstacle in achieving this historical goal of our nation. If we do not take advantage of the situation which presents itself today [...] we shall miss the last chance that history offers to us. And I do not wish to miss it, because if I do so further generations will blame me." He made a contradictory statement about the murder of Jews in Chișinău, claiming that their perpetrators were "bastards" who "stained" his regime's reputation. Antonescu saw the "war" against the Jews as being just as important as the war against the Soviet Union, and regularly demanded reports from his officers in Bessarabia and Transnistria about their measures against the Jews. In late August 1941, in Tighina, Antonescu called a secret conference attended by himself, the governors of Bessarabia and Bukovina and the governor-designate of Transnistria to discuss his plans regarding the Jews in those regions.

Many deaths followed, as the direct results of starvation and exhaustion,Final Report, pp. 135–136, 244–245 while the local German troops carried out selective shootings. The survivors were sent back over the river, and the German commanders expressed irritation over the methods applied by their counterparts.Final Report, pp. 65–66, 135–136, 383; Deletant, pp. 150–152 Romanian authorities subsequently introduced ghettos or transit camps.Final Report, pp. 66, 136–137, 200–201; Deletant, pp. 124, 146–149, 152–153, 184–187; Ioanid, p. 233 After the annexation of Transnistria, there ensued a systematic deportation of Jews from Bessarabia, with additional transports of Jews from the Old Kingdom (especially Moldavia-proper).Final Report, p. 138sqq; Ancel (2005 b), passim; Deletant, pp. 116, 123–126, 141–142, 152–230, 275, 321–341; Ioanid, pp. 231, 233–234; Kelso, pp. 100–101; Ornea, pp. 394–395; Weber, passim Based on an assignment Antonescu handed down to General Ioan Topor, the decision involved specific quotas, and the transports, most of which were carried out by foot, involved random murders.Final Report, pp. 26, 139–140, 210–211; Deletant, pp. 152–165, 171; Penkower, p. 149; Weber, p. 151 In conjunction with Antonescu's expansionist ambitions, it is possible that the ultimate destination for the survivors, once circumstances permitted it, was further east than the Southern Bug. On 11 October 1941, the chief of the Federation of Jewish Communities, Wilhelm Filderman issued a public letter to Antonescu asking him to stop the deportations, writing: "This is death, death for no reason except that they are Jews." Antonescu replied to Filderman in a long letter explaining that because the entire Jewish community of Bessarabia had allegedly collaborated with the Soviets during the Soviet occupation of Bessarabia, his policies were a justified act of revenge. On 11 November 1941, Antonescu sent Filderman a second letter stating no Jews would be allowed to live in the "liberated territories" and as for the Jews of the Regat:

We decided to defend our Romanian rights because our all-too-tolerant past was taken advantage of by the Jews and facilitated the abuse of our rights by foreigners, particularly the Jews...We are determined to put an end to this situation. We cannot afford to put in jeopardy the existence of our nation because of several hundred thousand Jews, or in order to salvage some principle of humane democracy that has not been understood properly."

The deportees' remaining property was nationalized, confiscated or left available for plunder. With its own Jewish population confined and subjected to extermination,Final Report, pp. 144–146, 178–179, 382; Ancel (2005 b), p. 231; Deletant, pp. 127, 128, 170–171, 177–180, 314–315, 329–331; Ioanid, pp. 231, 233–235, 236 Transnistria became infamous in short time, especially so for its five main concentration camps: Peciora, Akhmechetka, Bogdanovka, Domanovka and Obodovka.Final Report, pp. 143, 146, 179, 385–386; Deletant, pp. 177–184 Manned by Romanian Gendarmes and local Ukrainian auxiliaries who acted with the consent of central authorities, Transnistrian localities became the sites of mass executions, particularly after the administrators became worried about the spread of typhus from the camps and into the surrounding region.Final Report, pp. 146–150, 293; Deletant, pp. 171, 177–184, 195, 323 At a Cabinet meeting on 16 December 1941 to discuss the fate of the Jews of Transnistria, Antonescu stated:

The question of the Yids is being discussed in Berlin. The Germans want to bring the Yids from Europe to Russia and settle them in certain areas, but there is still time before this plan is carried out. Meanwhile, what should we do? Shall we wait for a decision in Berlin? Shall we wait for a decision that concerns us? Shall we ensure their safety? Pack them into catacombs! Throw them into the Black Sea! As far I am concerned, 100 may die, 1,000 may die, all of them may die"

Between 21–24 and 28–31 December 1941, Romanian gendarmes and Ukrainian auxiliaries killed about 70,000 Jews at the Bogdanovca camp; the massacre was Antonescu's way of dealing with a typhus epidemic that had broken out among the Jews of Transnistria owing to the poor living conditions that had been forced to endure. The last wave of Jewish deportations, occurring in June 1942, came mainly from the Cernăuți area in Northern Bukovina.Deletant, pp. 161, 165

Also in the summer of 1942, Ion Antonescu became a perpetrator of the Porajmos, or Holocaust-related crimes against the Romani people, when he ordered the Transnistrian deportation of Romanian Romani from the Old Kingdom, transited through camps and resettled in inhumane conditions near the Southern Bug.Final Report, pp. 226–241, 250, 252; Achim, pp. 168–180; Deletant, pp. 187–196, 331–332; Ioanid, p. 234; Kelso, pp. 98, 100sqq; Weber, p. 151 They were joined there by 2,000 conscientious objectors of the Inochentist church, a millennialist denomination. As Antonescu admitted during his trial, he personally supervised these operations, giving special orders to the Gendarmerie commanders. In theory, the measures taken against Romani people were supposed to affect only nomads and those with a criminal record created or updated recently, but arbitrary exceptions were immediately made to this rule, in particular by using the vague notion of "undesirable" to define some members of sedentary communities. The central authorities noted differences in the criteria applied locally, and intervened to prevent or sanction under-deportation and, in some cases, over-deportation. Antonescu and Constantin Vasiliu had been made aware of the problems Transnistria faced in feeding its own population, but ignored them when deciding in favour of expulsion. With most of their property confiscated, the Romani men, women and children were only allowed to carry hand luggage, on which they were supposed to survive winter. Famine and disease ensued from criminal negligence, Romani survival being largely dependent on occasional government handouts, the locals' charity, stealing and an underground economy. Once caught, escapees who made their way back into Romania were returned by the central authorities, even as local authorities were objecting.

Odessa massacre

The Odessa massacre, an act of collective punishment carried out by the Romanian Army and Gendarmes, took the lives of a minimum of between 15,000 and 25,000 to as many as 40,000 or even more than 50,000Weinberg, p. 239 Jewish people of all ages. The measure came as the enforcement of Antonescu's own orders, as retaliation for an explosion that killed 67 people at Romanian headquarters on that city. Antonescu believed that the original explosion was a terrorist act, rejecting the possibility of the building in question having been fitted with land mines by the retreating Soviets.Final Report, p. 151; Trașcă, p. 391 In addition, Antonescu blamed the Jews, specifically "Jewish commissars" in the Red Army, for the losses suffered by his 4th Army throughout the siege, although both an inquiry he had ordered and German assessments pointed to the ill-preparedness of Romanian soldiers. While the local command took the initiative for the first executions, Antonescu's personal intervention amplified the number of victims required, and included specific quotas (200 civilians for every dead officer, 100 for every dead soldier). By the time of the explosion, the Jewish population was already rounded up into makeshift ghettos, being made subject to violence and selective murders.

Purportedly the largest single massacre of Jews in the war's history, it involved mass shootings, hangings, acts of immolation and a mass detonation.Final Report, pp. 151–153, 323; Trașcă, pp. 391–394. The detonation was a method of execution ordered by Antonescu personally (Final Report, pp. 152–153; Trașcă, p. 393). Antonescu is quoted saying that the Romanian Army's criminal acts were "reprisals, not massacres". Survivors were deported to the nearby settlement of Slobidka, and kept in inhumane conditions. Alexianu himself intervened with Antonescu for a solution to their problems, but the Romanian leader decided he wanted them out of the Odessa area, citing the nearby resistance of Soviet troops in the Siege of Sevastopol as a ferment for similar Jewish activities. His order to Alexianu specified: "Pack them into the catacombs, throw them into the Black Sea, but get them out of Odessa. I don't want to know. A hundred can die, a thousand can die, all of them can die, but I don't want a single Romanian official or officer to die." Defining the presence of Jews in occupied Odessa as "a crime", Antonescu added: "I don't want to stain my activity with such lack of foresight." As a result of this, around 35,000–40,000 Jewish people were deported out of Odessa area and into other sectors of Transnistria. Several thousands were purposefully driven into Berezivka and other areas inhabited by the Black Sea Germans, where Selbstschutz organizations massacred them.

Overall death toll and particularities

A common assessment ranks Antonescu's Romania as second only to Nazi Germany in its antisemitic extermination policies. According to separate works by historians Dennis Deletant and Adrian Cioroianu, the flaws of Antonescu's 1946 trial notwithstanding, his responsibility for war crimes was such that he would have been equally likely to be found guilty and executed in a Western Allied jurisdiction. The often singular brutality of Romanian-organized massacres was a special topic of reflection for Jewish Holocaust escapee and American political theorist Hannah Arendt, as discussed in her 1963 work Eichmann in Jerusalem. Official Romanian estimates made in 2003 by the Wiesel Commission mention that between 280,000 and 380,000 Jews were killed by Romanian authorities under Antonescu's rule. "Moldova critică reabilitarea parțială a lui Antonescu", BBC Romanian edition, 23 February 2007 The Transnistria deportations account for 150,000 to 170,000 individual expulsions of Jews from Romania proper, of whom some 90,000–120,000 never returned.Final Report, p. 382; Deletant, p. 127; Ornea, p. 394; Weber, p. 151 According to Romanian-born Israeli historian Jean Ancel, the Transnistria deportations from other areas account for around 145,000 deaths, while the number of local Transnistrian Jews killed could be as high as 280,000. More conservative estimates for the latter number mention some 130,000–180,000 victims. Other overall estimates speak of 200,000 to over 300,000 Jews purposefully killed as a result of Romania's action. According to historians Antony Polonsky and Joanna B. Michlic: "none of these massacres was carried out by the Germans, although [the latter] certainly encouraged such actions and, in some cases, may have coordinated them." The Romani deportations affected some 25,000 people, at least 11,000 of whom died in Transnistria.

The Jewish population in the Old Kingdom, numbering between 300,000 and 400,000 people, survived the Holocaust almost intact. Reflecting on this fact, Lucian Boia noted that Antonescu could not "decently" be viewed as a rescuer of Jews, but that there still is a fundamental difference between the effects of his rule and those of Hitler's, concluding that the overall picture is not "completely dark." For Dennis Deletant, this situation is a "major paradox" of Antonescu's time in power: "more Jews survived under [Antonescu's] rule than in any other country within Axis Europe." American historian of Romania William O. Oldson views Antonescu's policies as characterized by "violence, inconsistency and inanity", but places them in the wider context of local antisemitism, noting some ideological exceptions from their respective European counterparts. These traits, he argues, became "providential" for the more assimilated Jewish communities of the Old Romanian Kingdom, while exposing Jews perceived as foreign. Discussing Antonescu's policy of ethnic cleansing, Polonksy and Mihlic note: "[it] raises important questions about the thin line between the desire to expel an unwanted minority and a small-scale genocidal project under sanctioned conditions." American military historian Gerhard L. Weinberg made reference to the Antonescu regime's "slaughter of large number of Jews in the areas ceded to the Soviet Union in 1940 when those areas were retaken in 1941 as well as in [...] Transnistria", but commented: "the government of Marshal Ion Antonescu preferred to rob and persecute Jews [from Romania]; the government would not turn them over to the Germans for killing."

Alongside the noticeable change in fortunes on the Eastern Front, a main motivator for all post-1943 changes, noted by various historians, was the manifold financial opportunity of Jewish survival. Wealthier Jews were financially extorted in order to avoid community work and deportation, and the work of some professionals was harnessed by the public sector, and even by the Army. From the beginning, the regime had excepted from deportations some Jews who were experts in fields such as forestry and chemistry, and some others were even allowed to return despite antisemitic protests in their home provinces. Economic exploitation was institutionalized in late 1941-early 1942, with the creation of a Central Jewish Office. Supervised by Commissioner Radu Lecca and formally led by the Jewish intellectuals Nandor Gingold and Henric Streitman, it collected funds which were in part redirected toward Maria Antonescu's charities. Small numbers of Romanian Jews left independently for the Palestine as early as 1941, but British opposition to Zionist plans made their transfer perilous (one notorious example of this being the MV Struma). On a personal level, Antonescu's encouragement of crimes alternated with periods when he gave in to the pleas of Jewish community leader Wilhelm Filderman. In one such instance, he reversed his own 1942 decision to impose the wearing of yellow badges, which nevertheless remained in use everywhere outside the Old Kingdom and, in theory, to any Romanian Jews elsewhere in Axis-controlled Europe. Assessing these contradictions, commentators also mention the effect of Allied promises to prosecute those responsible for genocide throughout Europe. In the late stages of the war, Antonescu was attempting to shift all blame for crimes from his regime while accusing Jews of "bring[ing] destruction upon themselves".

The regime permitted non-deported Romanian Jews and American charities to send humanitarian aid into Transnistrian camps, a measure it took an interest in enforcing in late 1942.Final Report, pp. 218, 383–384; Deletant, p. 100 Deportations of Jews ceased altogether in October of the same year. A common explanation historians propose for this reassessment of policies is the change in Germany's fortunes on the Eastern Front, with mention that Antonescu was considering using the Jewish population as an asset in his dealings with the Western Allies.Final Report, pp. 252–253; Ancel (2005 b), pp. 231–234; Deletant, pp. 100–101; Ornea, p. 394; Penkower, pp. 153, 161. The decision appears to have been taken by Mihai Antonescu at a time when the leader was incapacitated by his 1942 disease (Deletant, pp. 209–211). It nevertheless took the regime more than a year to allow more selective Jewish returns from Transnistria, including some 2,000 orphans.Final Report, pp. 218–220, 251–252, 383–384; Ancel (2005 b), pp. 232–234; Deletant, pp. 118–119, 203–204, 215–225, 338–340 After Transnistria's 1944 evacuation, Antonescu himself advocated the creation of new camps in Bessarabia. In conversations with his cabinet, the Conducător angrily maintained that surviving Jews were better off than Romanian soldiers.

The policies applied in respect to the Romani population were ambivalent: while ordering the deportation of those he considered criminals, Ion Antonescu was taking some interest in improving the lives of Romani laborers of the Bărăgan Plain. According to Romanian historian Viorel Achim, although it had claimed the existence of a "Gypsy problem", the Antonescu regime "did not count it among its priorities." By 1943, Antonescu was gradually allowing those deported to return home. Initially, Constantin Vasiliu allowed the families of soldiers to appeal their deportation on a selective basis. Romanian authorities also appear to have been influenced by the objections of Nazi administrators in the Reichskommissariat Ukraine, who feared that the newly arrived population would outnumber local Germans. By January 1944, the central authorities ordered local ones not to send back apprehended fugitives, instructed them to provide these with some food and clothing, and suggested corporal punishment for Romani people who did not adhere to a behavioural code. As the Romanian administrators abandoned Transnistria, most survivors from the group returned on their own in summer 1944.

Antonescu and the Final Solution projects
Ion Antonescu and his subordinates were for long divided on the issue of the Final Solution, as applied in territories under direct Nazi control from 1941. At an early stage, German attempts to impose the RSHA's direct control over Old Kingdom Jews drew some objections from Mihai Antonescu, but the two sides agreed to a common policy with reference to Soviet Jews. In various of his early 1940s statements, Ion Antonescu favorably mentions the Axis goal of eliminating the Jewish presence in the event of victory. The unrestrained character of some Romanian actions toward Jews alarmed Nazi officials, who demanded a methodical form of extermination. When confronted with German decisions to push back Jews he had expelled before the occupation of Transnistria, Antonescu protested, arguing that he had conformed with Hitler's decisions regarding "eastern Jews". In August 1941, in preparation for the Final Solution's universal application, Hitler remarked: "As for the Jewish question, today in any case one could say that a man like Antonescu, for example, proceeds much more radically in this manner than we have done until now. But I will not rest or be idle until we too have gone all the way with the Jews."

By summer 1942, German representatives in Romania obtained Antonescu's approval to deport the remaining Jewish population to extermination camps in occupied Poland.Final Report, pp. 66–69, 167–172, 243, 249, 286, 383; Deletant, pp. 205–215, 334–336; Ioanid, p. 234; Weber, p. 150 Among those involved on the German side were mass murderer Adolf Eichmann and his aide Gustav Richter, while the Romanian side was represented by Jewish Affairs Commissioner Lecca (reporting to Antonescu himself). Richter directed Lecca in setting up the Central Jewish Office, which he assumed would function as a Judenrat to streamline extermination policies. According to such plans, only some 17,000 Jews, labeled useful to Romania's economy, were to be exempt.Final Report, p. 171 The transports had already been announced to the Romanian Railways by autumn 1942, but the government eventually decided to postpone these measures indefinitely as was done with most other deportations to Transnistria.Final Report, pp. 69, 171–172, 243, 249, 383; Deletant, pp. 127, 208–215, 334–336; Penkower, pp. 152–153 Antonescu's new orders on the matter were brought up in his conversations with Hitler at Schloss Klessheim, where both leaders show themselves aware of the fate awaiting Jewish deportees to Poland. By then, German authorities charged with applying the Final Solution in Eastern Europe completely abandoned their plans with respect to Romania. In August 1942, Antonescu had worked out plans with the SS for deporting all of the Jews of the Regat or the "Old Kingdom" to the German-run death camps in Poland, but then cancelled the deportation. The principal reasons for his change of mind were signs of disapproval from court circles, a warning from the American government passed on by the Swiss ambassador that he would prosecuted for war crimes and crimes against humanity after the Allies had won if the deportation went ahead, and most importantly because Hitler would not undo the Second Vienna Award and return northern Transylvania to Romania. Antonescu saw the deportation of the Jews of the Regat as the pro quid quo for the return of Transylvania and unable to obtain satisfactory promises from the German Ambassador Baron Manfred von Killinger that Romania would be rewarded with the return of Transylvania in exchange for handing over its Jews, Antonescu cancelled the deportation until the Germans would make him a better offer.

According to Oldson, by the final stage of the war Romania rejected "all extreme measures against Jews who could not be proven to be communists." The planned transports to Palestine, the prospect of which irritated Nazi German observers, implied a hope that the Allies' focus would shift away from the regime's previous guilt and, at the same time, looked forward to payments to be made in exchange for each person saved. The contrary implications of Romanian nationalism, manifested as reluctance to obey German commands and discomfort with drastic change in general, are occasionally offered as further explanations of the phenomenon. While reflecting upon the issue of emigration to Palestine, Antonescu also yielded to pleas of Jewish community leaders, and allowed safe passage through Romania for various Northern Transylvanian Jews fleeing the Holocaust in Hungary. He was doing the same for certain Northern Transylvanian Romani communities who had escaped southwards. In that context, Nazi German ideologues began objecting to Antonescu's supposed leniency. Antonescu nevertheless alternated tolerance of illegal immigration with drastic measures. In early 1944, he issued an order to shoot illegal immigrants, which was probably never enforced by the Border Police (who occasionally turned in Jewish refugees to the German authorities). The Antonescu regime allowed the extermination of the Romanian Jewish diaspora in other parts of Europe, formally opposing their deportation in some cases where it appeared Germany was impinging upon Romania's sovereignty.

Opposition and political persecution

Political mainstream

The circumstances of wartime accounted for cautious and ambivalent approaches to Antonescu's rule from among the Romanian political mainstream, which grouped advocates of liberal democracy and anti-fascism. According to Gledhill and King: "Romanian liberals had been critical of their government's warm relationship with Hitler, which had been developing throughout the 1930s, but the [1940] Soviet attack on Romanian territory left them with little chance but to support Germany's invasion of the Soviet Union." Other authors also cite the Greater Romanian agenda of the Antonescu executive as a reason behind the widespread acquiescence. The tendency was illustrated by Dinu Brătianu, who, in late January 1941, told his National Liberal colleagues that the new "government of generals" was "the best solution possible to the current crisis", urging the group to provide Antonescu with "all the support we can give him." An early point of contention between Antonescu and the National Peasants' Party came in spring 1941, when Antonescu's support for the Balkans Campaign and Romania's claim to parts of Vojvodina were met with a letter of protest from Iuliu Maniu, which Antonescu dismissed. Maniu and Brătianu also issued several condemnations of Antonescu's decision to continue the war beyond the Dniester.Deletant, pp. 51, 84–85, 93–94, 98, 266–267; Kenney, p. 93; King, p. 94 One such letter, signed by both, claimed that, while earlier steps had been "legitimized by the entire soul of the nation, the Romanian people will never consent to the continuation of the struggle beyond our national borders." Maniu specifically mentioned the possibility of Allied victory, accused Antonescu of diverting attention from the goal of Greater Romania (Northern Transylvania included), and stressed that Romania's ongoing participation in the Axis was "troubling enough".

Antonescu is known to have publicly admonished opposition leaders for their disobedience, which he equated with obstruction, and to have monitored their activities through the Special Intelligence Service. However, some early communiqués he addressed to Brătianu also feature offers of resignation, which their recipient reluctantly rejected. The Germans objected to such ambiguities, and Hitler once advised Antonescu to have Maniu killed, an option which the Conducător rejected because of the PNȚ leader's popularity with the peasants. While tolerating contacts between Maniu and the Allies, Antonescu arrested the clandestine British envoys to Romania, thus putting a stop to the 1943 Operation Autonomous. In parallel, his relationship with Queen Mother Helen and Michael rapidly deteriorated after he began advising the royal family on how to conduct its affairs. Dissent from Antonescu's policies sometimes came from inside his own camp. Both the officer corps and the General Staff were divided on the issue of war beyond the Dniester, although it is possible that the majority agreed it would bring Northern Transylvania back to Romania. A prominent case was that of Iosif Iacobici, the Chief of the Romanian General Staff, whose objection to the massive transfer of Romanian troops to the Eastern Front resulted in his demotion and replacement with Ilie Șteflea (January 1942). Șteflea issued similar calls, and Antonescu's eventually agreed to preserve a home army just before the Battle of Stalingrad. Various other military men extended their protection to persecuted Jews. Overall, Antonescu met significant challenges in exercising control over the politicized sectors in the armed forces.

Antonescu's racial discrimination laws and Romania's participation in the Holocaust earned significant objections from various individuals and groups in Romanian society. One noted opponent was Queen Mother Helen, who actively intervened to save Jews from being deported.Final Report, pp. 286, 288, 290, 300; Deletant, pp. 212, 337; Ioanid, p. 234; Weber, pp. 158–159 The Mayor of Cernăuți, Traian Popovici, publicly objected to the deportation of Jews, as did Gherman Pântea, his counterpart in Odessa. The appeals of Queen Helen, King Michael, the Orthodox Metropolitan of Transylvania Nicolae Bălan, Apostolic Nuncio Andrea Cassulo and Swiss Ambassador René de Weck are credited with having helped avert the full application of the Final Solution in Antonescu's Romania. Cassulo and Bălan together pleaded for the fate of certain Jews, including all who had converted to Christianity, and the former publicly protested against deportations. While Romania and the United States were still at peace, American Minister Plenipotentiary Franklin Mott Gunther repeatedly attempted to make his superiors aware of Romanian actions against the Jews, and Turkish diplomats unsuccessfully sought American approval for transferring Romanian Jews to safe passage through Anatolia and into Palestine. Dinu Brătianu also condemned antisemitic measures, prompting Antonescu to accuse him of being an ally of "the Yid in London". Together with Maniu and Ion Mihalache, Brătianu signed statements condemning the isolation, persecution and expulsion of Jews, which prompted Antonescu to threaten to clamp down on them. However, both parties were occasionally ambiguous on racial issues, and themselves produced antisemitic messages. Brătianu is also known for publicly defending the cause of Romani people, opposing their deportation on grounds that it would "turn back the clock on several centuries of history", a stance which drew support from his civilian peers. In parallel, some regular Romanians such as nurse Viorica Agarici intervened to save Jewish lives, while, from inside the Jewish community, Chief Rabbi Alexandru Șafran and activist Mișu Benvenisti rallied with Wilhelm Filderman in public protests against Antonescu's decisions, being occasionally joined by A. L. Zissu. In 1943, Filderman himself was deported to Mohyliv-Podilskyi, but eventually allowed to return.

Political underground

Organized resistance movements in Antonescu's Romania were comparatively small-scale and marginal. In addition to a Zionist underground which aided Jews to pass through or flee the country, the regime was confronted with local political movements of contrasting shades. One of them comprised far left and left-wing elements, which Antonescu's rise to power had caught in an unusual position. The minor Romanian Communist Party, outlawed since the rule of Ferdinand I for its Cominternist national policies, had been rendered virtually inactive by the German-Soviet non-aggression pact. Once reanimated by Operation Barbarossa, the PCR was unable to create an actual armed resistance movement, although it was able to coordinate the policies of several other small leftist groups. Speaking shortly before the invasion of the Soviet Union, and adopting the "Jewish Bolshevism" position, Antonescu ordered authorities to compile lists comprising "the names of all Jewish and communist agents", who were to be kept under close surveillance. Among people arrested on suspicion of communism, Jews were sent to Transnistrian sites such as Vapniarka and Rîbnița, while others were interned in regular facilities such as those in Caransebeș and Târgu Jiu. In all, some 2,000 Jewish Romanian deportees to the region had been accused of political crimes (the category also included those who had tried to escape forced labor). According to one estimate, people held on charges of being communists accounted for just under 2,000 people, of whom some 1,200 were jailed in Romania proper. Capital punishment was used against various partisan-like activists, while the vast majority of communist prisoners in Rîbnița were massacred in March 1944. At the other end of the political spectrum, after the Legionary Rebellion and the Iron Guard's decapitation, many Legionaries who opposed the regime, and whom Antonescu himself believed were "communists in [Legionary] green shirts", were killed or imprisoned. An Iron Guardist underground was nevertheless formed locally, and probably numbered in thousands. Some of Antonescu's political prisoners from both camps were given a chance to redeem themselves by joining units on the Eastern Front.

Although repressed, divided and weak, the PCR capitalized on the Soviet victories, being integrated into the mainstream opposition. At the same time, a "prison faction" emerged around Gheorghe Gheorghiu-Dej, opposing both the formal leadership and the so-called "Muscovite" communists who had taken refuge in the Soviet Union before the war. While maneuvering for control within the PCR during and after 1944, "prison" communists destroyed a third group, formed around the PCR's nominal leader Ștefan Foriș (whom they kidnapped and eventually killed). The PCR leadership was still suffering from a crisis of legitimacy after beginning talks with the larger parties. The Soviets and "Muscovite" communists campaigned among Romanian prisoners of war in order to have them switch sides in the war, and eventually managed to set up the Tudor Vladimirescu Division.

Cultural circles
Measures enforced by the Ion Antonescu regime had contradictory effects on the Romanian cultural scene. According to Romanian literary historians Letiția Guran and Alexandru Ștefan, "the Antonescu regime [...] did not affect negatively cultural modernity. The Romanian cultural elite regarded Antonescu's policies for the most part with sympathy." Nevertheless, other researchers record the dissent of several cultural environments: the classic liberalism and cosmopolitanism of aging literary theorist Eugen Lovinescu, the "Lovinescian" Sibiu Literary Circle, and the rebellious counterculture of young avant-garde writers (Ion Caraion, Geo Dumitrescu, Dimitrie Stelaru, Constant Tonegaru). Prominent left-wing writers Tudor Arghezi, Victor Eftimiu and Zaharia Stancu were political prisoners during the Antonescu years. Author George Călinescu also stood out against the official guidelines, and, in 1941, took a risk by publishing a synthesis of Romanian literature which emphasized Jewish contributions, while composer George Enescu pleaded with Antonescu personally for the fate of Romani musicians. Similar acts of solidarity were performed by various prominent intellectuals and artists. In August 1942, King Michael received a manifesto endorsed by intellectuals from various fields, deploring the murders in Transnistria, and calling for a realignment of policies. Another such document of April 1944 called for an immediate peace with the Soviet Union. On a more intimate level, a diary kept by philosopher and art critic Alice Voinescu expresses her indignation over the antisemitic measures and massacres.

A special aspect of political repression and cultural hegemony was Antonescu's persecution of Evangelical or Restorationist Christian denominations, first outlawed under the National Legionary regime. Several thousand adherents of the Pentecostal Union and the Baptist Union were reportedly jailed in compliance with his orders. Persecution targeted groups of religiously motivated conscientious objectors. In addition to the Inochentist movement, these groups included the Pentecostal Union, the Seventh-day Adventist Conference and the Jehovah's Witnesses Association. Antonescu himself recounted having contemplated using the death penalty against "sects" who would not allow military service, and ultimately deciding in favor of deporting "recalcitrant" ones.

Legacy

Consequences of the Antonescu trial
The period following Antonescu's fall returned Romania to a democratic regime and the 1923 Constitution, as well as its participation in the war alongside the Allies. However, it also saw the early stages of a communist takeover—which culminated with King Michael's forced abdication on 30 December 1947 and the subsequent establishment of Communist Romania. The Antonescu trial thus fit into a long series of similar procedures and political purges on charges of collaborationism, instrumented by the Romanian People's Tribunals and various other institutions. During the rigged general election of 1946 and for years after Ion Antonescu's execution, the Romanian Communist Party and its allies began using the implications of his trial as an abusive means of compromising some of their political opponents.Final Report, pp. 315–316, 324; Deletant, pp. 249–250, 349; Ioanid, p. 235 One such early example was Iuliu Maniu, by then one of the country's prominent anti-communists, who was accused of being a fascist and an Antonescu sympathizer, mainly for having shaken his hand during the trial. The enlistment of ethnic Germans into Nazi German units, as approved by Antonescu, was used as a pretext for a Soviet-led expulsion of Germans from Romania.Cioroianu, pp. 266–267 On similar grounds, the Soviet occupation forces organized the capture of certain Romanian citizens, as well as the return of war refugees from Romania proper into Bessarabia and Northern Bukovina. Both the arrestees and the returnees were often deported deeper into the Soviet Union. As part of its deteriorating relationship with Romanian Roman Catholics, and urged on by the Soviets, the communist cabinet of Petru Groza also deemed Apostolic Nuncio Andrea Cassulo a collaborator of Antonescu and a persona non grata, based on transcripts of the Cassulo-Antonescu conversations. It also used such allegations to pressure several Greek-Catholic clergymen into accepting union with the Romanian Orthodox Church.

Nevertheless, Romanian-born Holocaust historian Radu Ioanid notes, few Romanians involved in organizing the Holocaust were prosecuted, and, of those, none were executed after the Antonescu trial. He attributes this to nationalist resistance within the administrative and judicial apparatus, to communist fears of alienating a too large number of people, to the emigration of Zionist survivors, and to the open hostility of some communists toward liberal Jewish community leaders. Jews also faced conflict with the new authorities and with the majority population, as described by other researchers. There were, nonetheless, sporadic trials for Holocaust-related crimes, including one of Maria Antonescu. Arrested in September 1944 and held 1945–1946 in Soviet custody, she was re-arrested at home in 1950, tried and ultimately found guilty of economic crimes for her collaboration with the Central Jewish Office. Five years later, she was sent into internal exile, and died of heart problems in 1964. After 1950, a large number of convicted war criminals, even some sentenced to life imprisonment, were deemed fit for "social cohabitation" (that is, fit to live amongst the general population) and released, while some suspects were never prosecuted.

In communist historiography
Although the Marxist analytical works of the increasingly marginalized communist figure Lucrețiu Pătrășcanu make isolated mentions of the Holocaust, the heavily politicized official discourse inspired by Soviet historiography interpreted Romania's wartime evolution exclusively based on the Marxist-Leninist idea of class conflict. In this context, the main effort to document and expose the Antonescu-era massacres came from Jewish Romanians. This began in 1945, when Jewish journalists Marius Mircu and Maier Rudrich contributed first-hand testimonies. In 1946–1948, the Jewish community leader Matatias Carp published Cartea neagră ("The Black Book"), a voluminous and detailed account of all stages of the Holocaust. After forming a secondary element in Antonescu's indictment, the deportation of Romani people was largely ignored in official discourse.

The communist regime overemphasized the part played by the PCR in King Michael's Coup, while commemorating its 23 August date as a national holiday.Boia, p. 119; Bucur (2004), pp. 173–176; Deletant, pp. 243, 265–266, 269, 344; Roper, pp. 13–14, 41–42 The Gheorghe Gheorghiu-Dej faction emerged as the winner of the interior PCR struggles and incorporated nationalist discourse. That faction claimed a decisive role in toppling Antonescu, even though a majority of its members had been jailed for most of the period. In accordance with Stalinist principles, censorship produced historical revisionism that excluded focus on such negative aspects of Romanian behavior during the war as antisemitism and the Holocaust, and obscured Romania's participation on the Eastern Front. Beginning in the mid-1960s, when Nicolae Ceaușescu took power and embarked on a national communist course, the celebration of 23 August as the inception of the communist regime was accompanied by a contradictory tendency, which implied a gradual rehabilitation of Antonescu and his regime. Historians who focused on this period believe that the revival of nationalist tenets and the relative distance taken from Soviet policies contributed to the rehabilitation process. After a period of liberalization, the increasingly authoritarian Ceaușescu regime revived the established patterns of personalized rule, and even made informal use of the title Conducător. Beginning in the early 1970s, when the new policies were consecrated by the July Theses, Ceaușescu tolerated a nationalist, antisemitic and Holocaust denialist intellectual faction, illustrated foremost by Săptămîna and Luceafărul magazines of Eugen Barbu and Corneliu Vadim Tudor, by poet Adrian Păunescu and his Flacăra journal, and by novelist Ion Lăncrănjan. The regime also came to cultivate a relationship with exiled tycoon Iosif Constantin Drăgan, a former Iron Guard member who had come to endorse both Antonescu's rehabilitation and the national communist version of protochronism. In contrast, much of dissident culture and the Romanian diaspora embraced the image of Michael I as its counterpart to the increasingly official Antonescu myth. Lucian Boia described this as "the spectacular confrontation between the two contradictory myths [transposing] into historical and mythological terms a fundamental fissure which divides the Romanian society of today."

Topics relating to the Holocaust in Romania were distorted during the communist era. Ceaușescu himself mentioned the number of survivors of the deportations (some 50,000 people) as a total number of victims, failed to mention the victims' ethnic background, and presented most of them as "communists and antifascists." The regime also placed emphasis on the Holocaust in Northern Transylvania (where the Final Solution had been applied by the Germans and the local Arrow Cross Party). Vladimir Tismăneanu has said Antonescu has a "pseudo-sacred aura" and many Romanians consider the attempts to diminsh this to be an affront to their national dignity: "In post-Communist societies, fantasies of persecution offer immense gratification to large strata of frustrated individuals". These national views are based on propaganda advanced during the Ceaușescu regime.

Earlier accounts of the massacres, which had already been placed under restricted use, were completely removed from public libraries. While a special politicized literature dealt with the Holocaust in Hungary, the entire Ceaușescu period produced only one work entirely dedicated to Romania's participation. Centred on the Iași pogrom, it shifted the blame from Romanian authorities and advanced a drastically reduced death toll. In its preface, official historian Nicolae Minei claimed that Romania was not responsible for any deaths among Jews. Other official texts made more radical claims, openly denying that Antonescu's regime was antisemitic, and that all those killed were victims of Germany or of circumstance.

Debates of the 1990s
Romanians' image of Antonescu shifted several times after the 1989 Revolution toppled communism. Polls carried out in the 1990s show the Conducător was well liked by portions of the general public. This tendency, Lucian Boia argues, was similar to a parallel trend favoring Wallachia's 15th century Prince Vlad III the Impaler, indicating a preference for "authoritarian solutions" and reflecting "a pantheon that was largely set in place in the 'Ceaușescu era' ". It was also popular at the time to see the 1944 Coup exclusively as the onset of communization in Romania,Final Report, pp. 319, 322, 330–331; Boia, pp. 340–341; Bucur (2004), p. 178; Deletant, pp. 270–271 while certain sections of the public opinion revived the notion of "Jewish Bolshevism", accusing Jews of having brought communism to Romania. British historian Tony Judt connected such reflexes to growing anti-Russian sentiment and Holocaust denial in various countries of the former Eastern Bloc, and termed them collectively "mis-memory of anti-communism". Vladimir Tismăneanu, a prominent Romanian-born political scientist, referred to Antonescu's "pseudo-sacred" image with the post-1989 public, and to the phenomenon as "fantasies of persecution." The wartime dictator's image appealed to many politicians of the post-1989 period, and sporadic calls for his rehabilitation were issued at the highest levels of authority. Far right groups issued calls for his canonization by the Romanian Orthodox Church (together with a similar request to canonize Corneliu Zelea Codreanu). Certain neofascist groups claim to represent a legacy of Codrenism from which Sima was a deviationist, and these have also become Antonescu apologists.

A particular case in this process was that of forces gathered around the Greater Romania Party, a group often characterized as merging xenophobic or neofascist messages and the legacy of Ceaușescu's national communism. Founded by party leader and former Săptămîna contributor Corneliu Vadim Tudor, România Mare magazine is known to have equated Antonescu and Ceaușescu, presenting them both as "apostles of the Romanian people". In his bid for the office of President during the 1996 election, Vadim Tudor vowed to be a new Antonescu. Boia remarks that this meeting of extremes offers an "extraordinary paradox". Drăgan also openly resumed his activities in Romania, often in collaboration with Vadim Tudor's group, founding three organizations tasked with campaigning for Antonescu's rehabilitation: the media outlet Europa Nova, the Ion Antonescu Foundation and the Ion Antonescu League. His colleague Radu Theodoru endorsed such projects while accusing Jews of being "a long-term noxious factor" and claiming that it was actually ethnic Romanians who were victims of a communist Holocaust. Ion Coja and Paul Goma notably produced radical claims relying on fabricated evidence and deflecting blame for the crimes onto the Jews themselves. Several journals edited by Ion Cristoiu repeatedly argued in favor of Antonescu's rehabilitation, also making xenophobic claims; similar views were sporadically present in national dailies of various hues, such as Ziua, România Liberă and Adevărul.

Various researchers argue that the overall tendency to exculpate Antonescu was endorsed by the ruling National Salvation Front (FSN) and its successor group, later known as Social Democratic Party, who complemented an emerging pro-authoritarian lobby while depicting their common opponent King Michael and his supporters as traitors. Similar attempts to deny the role of Antonescu in the Holocaust were also made by the main opposition parties, the Christian Democratic National Peasants' Party and the National Liberal Party, with Radu Câmpeanu, the latter party's president, publicly describing the wartime leader as a "great Romanian" who tried to defend the Jews.  Sections of both governing and opposition groups contemplated the idea of rehabilitating the wartime leader, and, in May 1991, Parliament observed a moment of silence in his memory. The perceived governmental tolerance of Antonescu's rehabilitation raised international concern and protests.Final Report, pp. 360–362; Boia, p. 29; Ioanid, pp. 249–250, 252; Kenney, p. 93 While the FSN-supported Romanian President Ion Iliescu publicly opposed attempts to rehabilitate Antonescu and acknowledged the "crimes he committed against the Jews", it was his successor, Emil Constantinescu, a representative of the Democratic Convention, who in 1997 became the first Romanian officeholder to recognize the collective responsibility of Romanian authorities. Nevertheless, during the same period, Attorney General Sorin Moisescu followed a since-deprecated special appeal procedure to overturn sentences passed against Antonescu and other 1946 defendants, which he eventually withdrew.

To a certain degree, such pro-Antonescu sentiments were also present in post-1989 historiography. Reflecting back on this phenomenon in 2004, Maria Bucur wrote: "the perverse image of Antonescu is not the product of a propaganda campaign led by right-wing extremists, but a pervasive myth fed by historical debates and political contests, and which the public seems indifferent to or accepts unproblematically." After the Revolution, archival sources concerning Antonescu, including those in the National Archives of Romania, were made more available to researchers, but documents confiscated or compiled by Soviet officials, kept in Russia, remained largely inaccessible. Although confronted with more evidence from the newly opened archives, several historians, including some employed by official institutions, continued to deny the Holocaust in Romania, and attributed the death toll exclusively to German units. In parallel, some continued an exclusive focus on Northern Transylvanian massacres. Local authors who have actively promoted Antonescu's image as a hero and wrote apologetic accounts of his politics include historians Gheorghe Buzatu and Mihai Pelin, and researcher Alex Mihai Stoenescu. Larry L. Watts published a similarly controversial monograph in the United States. Although criticized for denying the uniqueness of the Holocaust and downplaying Antonescu's complicity, Dinu C. Giurescu was recognized as the first post-communist Romanian historian to openly acknowledge his country's participation, while his colleagues Șerban Papacostea and Andrei Pippidi were noted as early critics of attempts to exculpate Antonescu. The matter of crimes in Transnistria and elsewhere was first included within the Romanian curriculum with a 1999 state-approved alternative textbook edited by Sorin Mitu.

Wiesel Commission and aftermath

In 2003, after a period in which his own equivocal stance on the matter had drawn controversy, Constantinescu's successor Ion Iliescu established the Wiesel Commission, an international group of expert historians whose mission was the study of the Holocaust in Romania, later succeeded by the Elie Wiesel National Institute. The Final Report compiled by the Commission brought the official recognition of Ion Antonescu's participation in the Holocaust. After that moment, public displays of support for Antonescu became illegal. Antonescu's SMERSH interrogations were recovered from the Russian archives and published in 2006. Despite the renewed condemnation and exposure, Antonescu remained a popular figure: as a result of the 2006 Mari Români series of polls conducted by the national station TVR 1, viewers nominated Antonescu as the 6th greatest Romanian ever. The vote's knockout phase included televised profiles of the ten most popular figures, and saw historian Adrian Cioroianu using the portion dedicated to Antonescu to expose and condemn him, giving voters reasons not to see the dictator as a great Romanian. The approach resulted in notable controversy after Ziua newspaper criticized Cioroianu, who defended himself by stating he had an obligation to tell the truth.

The same year, on 5 December, the Bucharest Court of Appeals overturned Antonescu's conviction for certain crimes against peace, on the grounds that the objective conditions of 1940 justified a preventive war against the Soviet Union, which would make Article 3 of the 1933 Convention for the Definition of Aggression inapplicable in his case "Reabilitarea numelui mareșalului Antonescu, respinsă" ,Mediafax, 6 May 2008 (as well as in those of Alexianu, Constantin Pantazi, Constantin Vasiliu, Sima and various Iron Guard politicians). This act raised official protests in Moldova, the independent state formed in Bessarabia upon the breakup of the Soviet Union, and in Russia, the Soviet successor state, as well as criticism by historians of the Holocaust. The Court of Appeals decision was overturned by the Romanian Supreme Court in May 2008. The same year, Maria Antonescu's collateral inheritors advanced a claim on a Predeal villa belonging to the couple, but a Brașov tribunal rejected their request, citing laws which confiscated the property of war criminals.

Cultural legacy, portrayals and landmarks
Beyond their propaganda and censorship efforts, Antonescu and his regime had a sizable impact on Romanian culture, art and literature. Owing to austere guidelines on culture and to the circumstances of wartime, this period's direct imprint is less than that of other periods in the country's history. Few large heroes' memorials were built during the war years. Memorials produced at the time were mainly roadside triptychs (troițe). The Heroes' Cult organization received expropriation rights to Bucharest's Jewish cemetery in 1942, and proposed to replace it with a major monument of this category, but that plan was eventually abandoned. Antonescu and his wife preferred donating to Orthodox churches, and were ktitors of churches in three separate Bucharest areas: Mărgeanului Church in Rahova, one in Dămăroaia, and the Saints Constantine and Helena Church in Muncii, where both the Marshal and his wife are depicted in a mural. After floods took a toll on his native Argeș County, the Marshal himself established Antonești, a model village in Corbeni (partly built by Ukrainian prisoners of war, and later passed into state property), while ordering hydroelectric exploitation of the Argeș River. He also had sporadic contacts with the artistic and literary environment, including an interview he awarded to his supporter, writer Ioan Alexandru Brătescu-Voinești. His 1946 trial was notably attended and documented by George Călinescu in a series of articles for Națiunea journal. Political humor of the 1940s preserved distinct images of the Romanian leader. Romanian jokes circulated under Antonescu's rule ridiculed his adoption of the title Marshal of Romania, viewing it as a self-promotion and dubbing him the "Auto-Marshal". During the war, Soviet agitprop portrayed Antonescu and the other secondary Axis leaders as villains and servile dog-like creatures, representations notably present in musical theater and puppetry shows, as well as in press cartoons.

Marin Preda's 1975 novel Delirul displays the Ceaușescu regime's ambiguous relationship with Antonescu. Critics John Neubauer and Marcel Cornis-Pope remark that the novel is "admittedly not [Preda's] best work", and discuss his "complex representation" of Antonescu as "an essentially flawed but active leader who tried to negotiate some maneuvering room between the demands of Germany and the threats of the Soviet Union [and whose failure] led to the dismantling of Romania's fragile democratic system." The book sought Antonescu's rehabilitation for his attitudes on the Bessarabia-Northern Bukovina issue, but did not include any mention of his antisemitic policies, of which Preda himself may have been ignorant. An international scandal followed, once negative comments on the book were published by the Soviet magazine Literaturnaya Gazeta. Although an outspoken nationalist, Eugen Barbu produced a satirical image of Antonescu in his own 1975 novel, Incognito, which was described by Deletant as "character assassination".

During the 1990s, monuments to Antonescu were raised and streets were named after him in Bucharest and several other cities.Final Report, pp. 359–361; Bucur (2004), pp. 158, 178; Ioanid, pp. 251–252; Kenney, p. 93; Ramet, p. 173 Among those directly involved in this process were Iosif Constantin Drăgan,Final Report, p. 360; Ioanid, p. 251; Shafir, p. 215 the nationalist Mayor of Cluj-Napoca, Gheorghe Funar, and General Mircea Chelaru, whose resignation from the Army was subsequently requested and obtained. Also during that interval, in 1993, filmmaker and Social Democratic politician Sergiu Nicolaescu produced Oglinda, which depicts Antonescu (played by Ion Siminie) apologetically. The rehabilitation trend was also represented at an October 1994 commemorative exhibit at the National Military Museum. The same year, a denialist documentary film, Destinul mareșalului ("The Marshal's Destiny"), was distributed by state-owned companies, a matter which raised concern. After the Wiesel Commission presented its findings and such public endorsement was outlawed, statues in Antonescu's likeness were torn down or otherwise made unavailable for public viewing.Final Report, pp. 359–361 An unusual case is that of his Saints Constantine and Helena Church, where, after lengthy debates, his bust was sealed inside a metal box. Outside of this context, the publicized display of Antonescu's portraits and racist slogans by football hooligans during Liga I's 2005–2006 season prompted UEFA intervention (see Racism Breaks the Game). As of 2019, Romania has nine streets named after Antonescu; locations include Constanța, Râmnicu Sărat and Bechet.

Awards and decorations
Antonescu received a number of awards and decorations throughout his military career, most notable being the Order of Michael the Brave, which was personally awarded to him by King Ferdinand I during the Hungarian–Romanian War of 1919. He also received several decorations from foreign countries. He was the first Romanian to receive the Knight's Cross of the Iron Cross, being awarded it by Hitler himself.

Notes

References and further reading

Final Report of the International Commission on the Holocaust in Romania, Polirom, Iași, 2004. 
Viorel Achim, The Roma in Romanian History, Central European University Press, Budapest, 2004. 
Jean Ancel,Preludiu la asasinat. Pogromul de la Iași, 29 iunie 1941, Polirom, Iași, 2005. 
" 'The New Jewish Invasion' – The Return of the Survivors in Transnistria", in David Bankier (ed.), The Jews are Coming Back: The Return of the Jews to Their Countries of Origin after WWII, Berghahn Books, Providence, 2005, pp. 231–256. 
Lucian Boia, Istorie și mit în conștiința românească, Humanitas, Bucharest, 1997. 
Christopher R. Browning, The Origins of the Final Solution: The Evolution of Nazi Jewish Policy, September 1939 – March 1942, University of Nebraska Press, Lincoln, 2004. 
Maria Bucur,
"Edifices of the Past: War Memorials and Heroes in Twentieth-century Romania", in Maria Todorova (ed.), Balkan Identities: Nation and Memory, C. Hurst & Co. Publishers, London, 2004, pp. 158–179. 
"Women's Stories as Sites of Memory: Gender and Remembering Romania's World Wars", in Nancy M. Wingfield, Maria Bucur (eds.), Gender & War in Twentieth-century Eastern Europe, Indiana University Press, Bloomington, 2006, pp. 171–192
Christopher Chant, The Encyclopedia of Codenames of World War II, Routledge & Kegan Paul Books Ltd., London, 1987. 
Adrian Cioroianu, Editura Curtea Veche, Bucharest, 2005. 
Marcel Cornis-Pope, John Neubauer (eds.), History of the Literary Cultures of East-Central Europe, John Benjamins, Amsterdam & Philadelphia, 2004. ; see:
Letiția Guran, Alexandru Ștefan, "Romanian Literature under Stalinism", pp. 112–124
John Neubauer et al., "1945", pp. 143–177
Dennis Deletant, Hitler's Forgotten Ally: Ion Antonescu and His Regime, Romania, 1940–1944, Palgrave Macmillan, London, 2006. 
 Deletant, Dennis.  "Romania" in The Oxford Companion to World War II edited by I. C. B. Dear and M. R. D. Foot  (2001) pp 954–959.
Stanislaw Frankowski, "Post-Communist Europe", in Peter Hodgkinson, Andrew Rutherford (eds.), Capital Punishment: Global Issues and Prospects, Waterside Press, Winchester, 1996, pp. 215–242. 
Aleksander Gella, Development of Class Structure in Eastern Europe: Poland and Her Southern Neighbors, State University of New York Press, Albany, 1989. 
Juliana Geran Pilon, The Bloody Flag. Post-Communist Nationalism in Eastern Europe. Spotlight on Romania (Studies in Social Philosophy & Policy No. 16), Transaction Publishers, New Brunswick & London, 1992. 
 Giurescu, Dinu C. Romania in the Second World War: 1939–1945 (East European Monographs, 2000).
Roger Griffin, The Nature of Fascism, Routledge, London, 1993. 
Arnold D. Harvey, Collision of Empires: Britain in Three World Wars, 1793–1945, Continuum International Publishing Group, London, 1992. 
Rebecca Ann Haynes, " 'A New Greater Romania'? Romanian Claims to the Serbian Banat in 1941", in Central Europe, Vol. 3, No. 2, November 2005, pp. 99–120; republished by University College London's Library Services
Radu Ioanid, "Romania", in David S. Wyman, Charles H. Rosenzveig (eds.), The World Reacts to the Holocaust, Johns Hopkins University Press, Baltimore & London, 1996, pp. 225–252. 
Michelle Kelso, "Gypsy Deportations from Romania to Transnistria, 1942–44", in Karola Fings, Donald Kenrick (eds.), In the Shadow of the Swastika: Volume 2: The Gypsies during the Second World War, University of Hertfordshire Press, Hatfield, 1999, pp. 95–130. 
Padraic Kenney, The Burdens of Freedom: Eastern Europe since 1989, Zed Books, London, 2006. 
Peter C. Kent, The Lonely Cold War of Pope Pius XII: The Roman Catholic Church and the Division of Europe, 1943–1950, McGill-Queen's University Press, Montreal & Kingston, 2002. 
Charles King, The Moldovans: Romania, Russia, and the Politics of Culture, Hoover Press, Stanford, 2000. 
Walter Laqueur, Fascism: Past, Present, Future, Oxford University Press, Oxford etc., 1997. 
Philip Morgan, Fascism in Europe, 1919–1945, Routledge, London, 2003. 
David Nicholls, Adolf Hitler: A Biographical Companion, ABC-CLIO, Santa Barbara, 2000. 
William O. Oldson, A Providential Anti-Semitism. Nationalism and Polity in Nineteenth-Century Romania, American Philosophical Society, Philadelphia, 1991. 
Z. Ornea, Anii treizeci. Extrema dreaptă românească, Editura Fundației Culturale Române, Bucharest, 1995. 
Monty Noam Penkower, The Jews Were Expendable: Free World Diplomacy and the Holocaust, Wayne State University Press, Detroit, 1988. 
Antony Polonsky, Joanna B. Michlic, introduction to The Neighbors Respond: The Controversy over the Jedwabne Massacre in Poland, Princeton University Press, Princeton, 2004, pp. 1–43. 
Sabrina P. Ramet, "The Way We Were—And Should Be Again? European Orthodox Churches and the 'Idyllic Past' ", in Timothy A. Byrnes, Peter J. Katzenstein (eds.), Religion in an Expanding Europe, Cambridge University Press, Cambridge, 2006. 
Steven D. Roper, Romania: The Unfinished Revolution, Routledge, London, 2000. 
Michael Shafir, "The Mind of Romania's Radical Right", in Sabrina P. Ramet (ed.), The Radical Right in Central and Eastern Europe since 1989, Penn State University Press, University Park, 1999, pp. 213–232. 
 Thomas, Martin. "To arm an ally: French arms sales to Romania, 1926–1940." Journal of Strategic Studies 19.2 (1996): 231–259.
Ottmar Trașcă, "Ocuparea orașului Odessa de căre armata română și măsurile adoptate față de populația evreiască" , in the Romanian Academy George Bariț Institute of History's Historica Yearbook 2008, pp. 377–425
Francisco Veiga, Istoria Gărzii de Fier, 1919–1941: Mistica ultranaționalismului, Humanitas, Bucharest, 1993. 
 Watts, Larry L. Romanian Cassandra: Ion Antonescu and the Struggle for Reform, 1916–1941 (East European Monographs, 1993)
Petru Weber, "Die Wahrnehmung des »Domestic Holocaust« im Rumänien der Nachkriegsjahre", in Regina Fritz, Carola Sachse, Edgar Wolfrum (eds.), Nationen und ihre Selbstbilder. Postdiktatorische Gesellschaften in Europa, Wallstein Verlag, Göttingen, 2008, pp. 150–167. 
Gerhard L. Weinberg, Germany, Hitler, and World War II: Essays in Modern German and World History, Cambridge University Press, Cambridge, 1996. 

Historiography and memory
 Chioveanu, Mihai. "A Deadlock Of Memory The Myth And Cult Of Ion Antonescu In Post-Communist Romania." Studia Hebraica 3 (2003): 102–123.
Treptow, Kurt W. Romania and World War II ( Center for Romanian Studies, 1996).
 White, George W.  Nationalism and Territory. Constructing Group Identity in Southeastern Europe'', Rowman & Littlefield, Lanham, 2000.

External links
 

|-

1882 births
1946 deaths
World War II political leaders
Eastern Orthodoxy and far-right politics
Heads of state of Romania
Prime Ministers of Romania
Romanian Ministers of Defence
Romanian Ministers of Foreign Affairs
Leaders ousted by a coup
Chiefs of the General Staff of Romania
Field marshals of Romania
Heads of government convicted of war crimes
Heads of state convicted of war crimes
Holocaust perpetrators in Romania
Romani genocide perpetrators
Romanian fascists
Romanian diplomats
Romanian essayists
People from Pitești
Eastern Orthodox Christians from Romania
Members of the Romanian Orthodox Church
Romanian military attachés
Romanian military personnel of the Second Balkan War
Romanian military personnel of World War I
Romanian people of World War II
Romanian anti-communists
Recipients of the Military Virtue Medal
Recipients of the Order of Michael the Brave, 1st class
Recipients of the Iron Cross (1939), 1st class
Recipients of the Knight's Cross of the Iron Cross
Romanian prisoners of war
World War II prisoners of war held by the Soviet Union
People convicted by the Romanian People's Tribunals
Romanian people convicted of war crimes
People convicted of the international crime of aggression
People executed by the Kingdom of Romania
People executed by Romania by firing squad
Executed politicians
Executed Romanian collaborators with Nazi Germany
Executed military leaders
Filmed executions
People executed for war crimes
Romanian politicians convicted of crimes
Executed heads of state
Executed prime ministers
20th-century essayists
Genocide perpetrators
Antiziganism in Romania
Heads of government who were later imprisoned
Fascist politicians
Antisemitism in Romania
Christian fascists
Anti-Masonry
Romanian conspiracy theorists
Christian conspiracy theorists
Executed mass murderers